

5001–5100 

|-bgcolor=#E9E9E9
| 5001 EMP ||  ||  || September 19, 1987 || Anderson Mesa || E. Bowell || — || align=right | 9.7 km || 
|-id=002 bgcolor=#fefefe
| 5002 Marnix ||  ||  || September 20, 1987 || Smolyan || E. W. Elst || EUT || align=right | 4.7 km || 
|-id=003 bgcolor=#fefefe
| 5003 Silvanominuto ||  ||  || March 15, 1988 || La Silla || W. Ferreri || — || align=right | 3.9 km || 
|-id=004 bgcolor=#fefefe
| 5004 Bruch ||  ||  || September 8, 1988 || Tautenburg Observatory || F. Börngen || — || align=right | 3.6 km || 
|-id=005 bgcolor=#fefefe
| 5005 Kegler || 1988 UB ||  || October 16, 1988 || Kushiro || S. Ueda, H. Kaneda || — || align=right | 3.5 km || 
|-id=006 bgcolor=#d6d6d6
| 5006 Teller ||  ||  || April 5, 1989 || Palomar || E. F. Helin || — || align=right | 13 km || 
|-id=007 bgcolor=#E9E9E9
| 5007 Keay ||  ||  || October 20, 1990 || Siding Spring || R. H. McNaught || EUN || align=right | 7.3 km || 
|-id=008 bgcolor=#fefefe
| 5008 Miyazawakenji || 1991 DV ||  || February 20, 1991 || Dynic || A. Sugie || FLO || align=right | 7.2 km || 
|-id=009 bgcolor=#fefefe
| 5009 Sethos || 2562 P-L ||  || September 24, 1960 || Palomar || PLS || — || align=right | 3.4 km || 
|-id=010 bgcolor=#E9E9E9
| 5010 Amenemhêt || 4594 P-L ||  || September 24, 1960 || Palomar || PLS || — || align=right | 17 km || 
|-id=011 bgcolor=#FFC2E0
| 5011 Ptah || 6743 P-L ||  || September 24, 1960 || Palomar || PLS || APO +1kmPHA || align=right | 1.9 km || 
|-id=012 bgcolor=#C2FFFF
| 5012 Eurymedon || 9507 P-L ||  || October 17, 1960 || Palomar || PLS || L4 || align=right | 37 km || 
|-id=013 bgcolor=#E9E9E9
| 5013 Suzhousanzhong ||  ||  || November 9, 1964 || Nanking || Purple Mountain Obs. || — || align=right | 10 km || 
|-id=014 bgcolor=#d6d6d6
| 5014 Gorchakov || 1974 ST ||  || September 19, 1974 || Nauchnij || L. I. Chernykh || — || align=right | 19 km || 
|-id=015 bgcolor=#fefefe
| 5015 Litke || 1975 VP ||  || November 1, 1975 || Nauchnij || T. M. Smirnova || FLO || align=right | 4.1 km || 
|-id=016 bgcolor=#fefefe
| 5016 Migirenko ||  ||  || April 2, 1976 || Nauchnij || N. S. Chernykh || — || align=right | 5.4 km || 
|-id=017 bgcolor=#d6d6d6
| 5017 Tenchi ||  ||  || February 18, 1977 || Kiso || H. Kosai, K. Furukawa || — || align=right | 22 km || 
|-id=018 bgcolor=#fefefe
| 5018 Tenmu ||  ||  || February 19, 1977 || Kiso || H. Kosai, K. Furukawa || — || align=right | 3.8 km || 
|-id=019 bgcolor=#fefefe
| 5019 Erfjord ||  ||  || June 25, 1979 || Siding Spring || E. F. Helin, S. J. Bus || V || align=right | 5.2 km || 
|-id=020 bgcolor=#fefefe
| 5020 Asimov ||  ||  || March 2, 1981 || Siding Spring || S. J. Bus || — || align=right | 3.5 km || 
|-id=021 bgcolor=#d6d6d6
| 5021 Krylania ||  ||  || November 13, 1982 || Nauchnij || L. G. Karachkina || THM || align=right | 18 km || 
|-id=022 bgcolor=#d6d6d6
| 5022 Roccapalumba ||  ||  || April 23, 1984 || La Silla || W. Ferreri || — || align=right | 33 km || 
|-id=023 bgcolor=#C2FFFF
| 5023 Agapenor ||  ||  || October 11, 1985 || Palomar || C. S. Shoemaker, E. M. Shoemaker || L4 || align=right | 28 km || 
|-id=024 bgcolor=#d6d6d6
| 5024 Bechmann || 1985 VP ||  || November 14, 1985 || Brorfelde || P. Jensen || — || align=right | 27 km || 
|-id=025 bgcolor=#C2FFFF
| 5025 Mecisteus ||  ||  || October 5, 1986 || Piwnice || M. Antal || L4slow? || align=right | 40 km || 
|-id=026 bgcolor=#fefefe
| 5026 Martes ||  ||  || August 22, 1987 || Kleť || A. Mrkos || ERI || align=right | 7.5 km || 
|-id=027 bgcolor=#C2FFFF
| 5027 Androgeos ||  ||  || January 21, 1988 || Palomar || C. S. Shoemaker || L4 || align=right | 60 km || 
|-id=028 bgcolor=#C2FFFF
| 5028 Halaesus ||  ||  || January 23, 1988 || Palomar || C. S. Shoemaker || L4 || align=right | 51 km || 
|-id=029 bgcolor=#d6d6d6
| 5029 Ireland ||  ||  || January 24, 1988 || Palomar || C. S. Shoemaker, E. M. Shoemaker || — || align=right | 12 km || 
|-id=030 bgcolor=#fefefe
| 5030 Gyldenkerne ||  ||  || November 3, 1988 || Brorfelde || P. Jensen || — || align=right | 7.5 km || 
|-id=031 bgcolor=#fefefe
| 5031 Švejcar ||  ||  || March 16, 1990 || Kleť || Z. Vávrová || MAS || align=right | 8.5 km || 
|-id=032 bgcolor=#d6d6d6
| 5032 Conradhirsh || 1990 OO ||  || July 18, 1990 || Palomar || E. F. Helin || EOS || align=right | 8.7 km || 
|-id=033 bgcolor=#d6d6d6
| 5033 Mistral || 1990 PF ||  || August 15, 1990 || Haute-Provence || E. W. Elst || KOR || align=right | 9.3 km || 
|-id=034 bgcolor=#fefefe
| 5034 Joeharrington ||  ||  || August 7, 1991 || Palomar || H. E. Holt || — || align=right | 4.8 km || 
|-id=035 bgcolor=#E9E9E9
| 5035 Swift || 1991 UX ||  || October 18, 1991 || Kushiro || S. Ueda, H. Kaneda || — || align=right | 8.9 km || 
|-id=036 bgcolor=#d6d6d6
| 5036 Tuttle ||  ||  || October 31, 1991 || Kushiro || S. Ueda, H. Kaneda || — || align=right | 23 km || 
|-id=037 bgcolor=#fefefe
| 5037 Habing || 6552 P-L ||  || September 24, 1960 || Palomar || PLS || moon || align=right | 5.7 km || 
|-id=038 bgcolor=#FA8072
| 5038 Overbeek || 1948 KF ||  || May 31, 1948 || Johannesburg || E. L. Johnson || — || align=right | 3.8 km || 
|-id=039 bgcolor=#d6d6d6
| 5039 Rosenkavalier ||  ||  || April 11, 1967 || Tautenburg Observatory || F. Börngen || EOS || align=right | 12 km || 
|-id=040 bgcolor=#fefefe
| 5040 Rabinowitz || 1972 RF ||  || September 15, 1972 || Palomar || T. Gehrels || PHO || align=right | 7.0 km || 
|-id=041 bgcolor=#C2FFFF
| 5041 Theotes ||  ||  || September 19, 1973 || Palomar || C. J. van Houten, I. van Houten-Groeneveld, T. Gehrels || L4 || align=right | 42 km || 
|-id=042 bgcolor=#d6d6d6
| 5042 Colpa || 1974 ME ||  || June 20, 1974 || El Leoncito || Félix Aguilar Obs. || EOS || align=right | 18 km || 
|-id=043 bgcolor=#d6d6d6
| 5043 Zadornov ||  ||  || September 19, 1974 || Nauchnij || L. I. Chernykh || THM || align=right | 15 km || 
|-id=044 bgcolor=#fefefe
| 5044 Shestaka ||  ||  || August 18, 1977 || Nauchnij || N. S. Chernykh || — || align=right | 6.4 km || 
|-id=045 bgcolor=#d6d6d6
| 5045 Hoyin ||  ||  || October 29, 1978 || Nanking || Purple Mountain Obs. || THM || align=right | 13 km || 
|-id=046 bgcolor=#E9E9E9
| 5046 Carletonmoore || 1981 DQ ||  || February 28, 1981 || Siding Spring || S. J. Bus || — || align=right | 6.4 km || 
|-id=047 bgcolor=#E9E9E9
| 5047 Zanda ||  ||  || March 2, 1981 || Siding Spring || S. J. Bus || — || align=right | 6.0 km || 
|-id=048 bgcolor=#E9E9E9
| 5048 Moriarty || 1981 GC ||  || April 1, 1981 || Anderson Mesa || E. Bowell || slow || align=right | 11 km || 
|-id=049 bgcolor=#fefefe
| 5049 Sherlock ||  ||  || November 2, 1981 || Anderson Mesa || E. Bowell || — || align=right | 5.0 km || 
|-id=050 bgcolor=#fefefe
| 5050 Doctorwatson ||  ||  || September 14, 1983 || Anderson Mesa || E. Bowell || — || align=right | 5.4 km || 
|-id=051 bgcolor=#fefefe
| 5051 Ralph || 1984 SM ||  || September 24, 1984 || Brorfelde || P. Jensen || V || align=right | 4.6 km || 
|-id=052 bgcolor=#fefefe
| 5052 Nancyruth ||  ||  || October 23, 1984 || Palomar || C. S. Shoemaker, E. M. Shoemaker || FLO || align=right | 4.6 km || 
|-id=053 bgcolor=#fefefe
| 5053 Chladni ||  ||  || March 22, 1985 || Anderson Mesa || E. Bowell || — || align=right | 9.6 km || 
|-id=054 bgcolor=#fefefe
| 5054 Keil ||  ||  || January 12, 1986 || Anderson Mesa || E. Bowell || — || align=right | 4.4 km || 
|-id=055 bgcolor=#d6d6d6
| 5055 Opekushin ||  ||  || August 13, 1986 || Nauchnij || L. I. Chernykh || THM || align=right | 16 km || 
|-id=056 bgcolor=#E9E9E9
| 5056 Rahua ||  ||  || September 9, 1986 || La Silla || H. Debehogne || — || align=right | 7.3 km || 
|-id=057 bgcolor=#d6d6d6
| 5057 Weeks ||  ||  || February 22, 1987 || La Silla || H. Debehogne || — || align=right | 16 km || 
|-id=058 bgcolor=#fefefe
| 5058 Tarrega || 1987 OM ||  || July 28, 1987 || Geisei || T. Seki || — || align=right | 5.8 km || 
|-id=059 bgcolor=#E9E9E9
| 5059 Saroma || 1988 AF ||  || January 11, 1988 || Kitami || K. Endate, K. Watanabe || EUN || align=right | 9.5 km || 
|-id=060 bgcolor=#E9E9E9
| 5060 Yoneta ||  ||  || January 24, 1988 || Kushiro || S. Ueda, H. Kaneda || MIS || align=right | 8.4 km || 
|-id=061 bgcolor=#d6d6d6
| 5061 McIntosh || 1988 DJ ||  || February 22, 1988 || Siding Spring || R. H. McNaught || EOS || align=right | 10 km || 
|-id=062 bgcolor=#fefefe
| 5062 Glennmiller || 1989 CZ ||  || February 6, 1989 || Palomar || E. F. Helin || NYS || align=right | 4.2 km || 
|-id=063 bgcolor=#fefefe
| 5063 Monteverdi ||  ||  || February 2, 1989 || Tautenburg Observatory || F. Börngen || NYS || align=right | 3.9 km || 
|-id=064 bgcolor=#fefefe
| 5064 Tanchozuru || 1990 FS ||  || March 16, 1990 || Kushiro || M. Matsuyama, K. Watanabe || FLO || align=right | 4.8 km || 
|-id=065 bgcolor=#E9E9E9
| 5065 Johnstone ||  ||  || March 24, 1990 || Palomar || E. F. Helin || — || align=right | 13 km || 
|-id=066 bgcolor=#FA8072
| 5066 Garradd || 1990 MA ||  || June 22, 1990 || Siding Spring || R. H. McNaught || — || align=right | 4.5 km || 
|-id=067 bgcolor=#E9E9E9
| 5067 Occidental || 1990 OX ||  || July 19, 1990 || Palomar || E. F. Helin || — || align=right | 16 km || 
|-id=068 bgcolor=#d6d6d6
| 5068 Cragg || 1990 TC ||  || October 9, 1990 || Siding Spring || R. H. McNaught || — || align=right | 14 km || 
|-id=069 bgcolor=#fefefe
| 5069 Tokeidai || 1991 QB ||  || August 16, 1991 || JCPM Sapporo || K. Watanabe || FLO || align=right | 6.2 km || 
|-id=070 bgcolor=#d6d6d6
| 5070 Arai || 1991 XT ||  || December 9, 1991 || Kushiro || S. Ueda, H. Kaneda || — || align=right | 28 km || 
|-id=071 bgcolor=#d6d6d6
| 5071 Schoenmaker || 3099 T-2 ||  || September 30, 1973 || Palomar || PLS || — || align=right | 16 km || 
|-id=072 bgcolor=#d6d6d6
| 5072 Hioki ||  ||  || October 9, 1931 || Heidelberg || K. Reinmuth || KOR || align=right | 7.5 km || 
|-id=073 bgcolor=#fefefe
| 5073 Junttura || 1943 EN ||  || March 3, 1943 || Turku || Y. Väisälä || FLO || align=right | 5.2 km || 
|-id=074 bgcolor=#d6d6d6
| 5074 Goetzoertel ||  ||  || August 24, 1949 || Brooklyn || Indiana University || EOS || align=right | 13 km || 
|-id=075 bgcolor=#fefefe
| 5075 Goryachev ||  ||  || October 13, 1969 || Nauchnij || B. A. Burnasheva || NYSslow || align=right | 4.8 km || 
|-id=076 bgcolor=#fefefe
| 5076 Lebedev-Kumach ||  ||  || September 26, 1973 || Nauchnij || L. I. Chernykh || — || align=right | 4.7 km || 
|-id=077 bgcolor=#fefefe
| 5077 Favaloro || 1974 MG ||  || June 17, 1974 || El Leoncito || Félix Aguilar Obs. || FLO || align=right | 4.5 km || 
|-id=078 bgcolor=#E9E9E9
| 5078 Solovjev-Sedoj || 1974 SW ||  || September 19, 1974 || Nauchnij || L. I. Chernykh || — || align=right | 7.9 km || 
|-id=079 bgcolor=#E9E9E9
| 5079 Brubeck || 1975 DB ||  || February 16, 1975 || El Leoncito || Félix Aguilar Obs. || — || align=right | 17 km || 
|-id=080 bgcolor=#fefefe
| 5080 Oja || 1976 EB ||  || March 2, 1976 || Kvistaberg || C.-I. Lagerkvist || FLO || align=right | 7.8 km || 
|-id=081 bgcolor=#fefefe
| 5081 Sanguin ||  ||  || November 18, 1976 || El Leoncito || Félix Aguilar Obs. || — || align=right | 17 km || 
|-id=082 bgcolor=#d6d6d6
| 5082 Nihonsyoki ||  ||  || February 18, 1977 || Kiso || H. Kosai, K. Furukawa || THM || align=right | 13 km || 
|-id=083 bgcolor=#E9E9E9
| 5083 Irinara || 1977 EV ||  || March 13, 1977 || Nauchnij || N. S. Chernykh || — || align=right | 8.2 km || 
|-id=084 bgcolor=#d6d6d6
| 5084 Gnedin ||  ||  || March 26, 1977 || Nauchnij || N. S. Chernykh || — || align=right | 18 km || 
|-id=085 bgcolor=#fefefe
| 5085 Hippocrene || 1977 NN ||  || July 14, 1977 || Nauchnij || N. S. Chernykh || FLO || align=right | 4.0 km || 
|-id=086 bgcolor=#fefefe
| 5086 Demin ||  ||  || September 5, 1978 || Nauchnij || N. S. Chernykh || — || align=right | 4.2 km || 
|-id=087 bgcolor=#E9E9E9
| 5087 Emelʹyanov ||  ||  || September 12, 1978 || Nauchnij || N. S. Chernykh || PAD || align=right | 13 km || 
|-id=088 bgcolor=#d6d6d6
| 5088 Tancredi ||  ||  || August 22, 1979 || La Silla || C.-I. Lagerkvist || THM || align=right | 16 km || 
|-id=089 bgcolor=#E9E9E9
| 5089 Nádherná || 1979 SN ||  || September 25, 1979 || Kleť || A. Mrkos || — || align=right | 8.9 km || 
|-id=090 bgcolor=#E9E9E9
| 5090 Wyeth || 1980 CG ||  || February 9, 1980 || Harvard Observatory || Harvard Obs. || — || align=right | 7.3 km || 
|-id=091 bgcolor=#E9E9E9
| 5091 Isakovskij ||  ||  || September 25, 1981 || Nauchnij || L. I. Chernykh || HOF || align=right | 14 km || 
|-id=092 bgcolor=#d6d6d6
| 5092 Manara || 1982 FJ ||  || March 21, 1982 || Anderson Mesa || E. Bowell || URS || align=right | 25 km || 
|-id=093 bgcolor=#E9E9E9
| 5093 Svirelia ||  ||  || October 14, 1982 || Nauchnij || L. G. Karachkina || EUN || align=right | 7.9 km || 
|-id=094 bgcolor=#d6d6d6
| 5094 Seryozha ||  ||  || October 20, 1982 || Nauchnij || L. G. Karachkina || KOR || align=right | 7.9 km || 
|-id=095 bgcolor=#fefefe
| 5095 Escalante || 1983 NL ||  || July 10, 1983 || Anderson Mesa || E. Bowell || — || align=right | 6.4 km || 
|-id=096 bgcolor=#fefefe
| 5096 Luzin ||  ||  || September 5, 1983 || Nauchnij || L. V. Zhuravleva || — || align=right | 6.9 km || 
|-id=097 bgcolor=#E9E9E9
| 5097 Axford ||  ||  || October 12, 1983 || Anderson Mesa || E. Bowell || — || align=right | 13 km || 
|-id=098 bgcolor=#E9E9E9
| 5098 Tomsolomon ||  ||  || February 14, 1985 || La Silla || H. Debehogne || — || align=right | 5.6 km || 
|-id=099 bgcolor=#fefefe
| 5099 Iainbanks ||  ||  || February 16, 1985 || La Silla || H. Debehogne || — || align=right | 6.2 km || 
|-id=100 bgcolor=#fefefe
| 5100 Pasachoff || 1985 GW ||  || April 15, 1985 || Anderson Mesa || E. Bowell || — || align=right | 11 km || 
|}

5101–5200 

|-bgcolor=#d6d6d6
| 5101 Akhmerov ||  ||  || October 22, 1985 || Nauchnij || L. V. Zhuravleva || EOS || align=right | 11 km || 
|-id=102 bgcolor=#E9E9E9
| 5102 Benfranklin ||  ||  || September 2, 1986 || Kleť || A. Mrkos || — || align=right | 17 km || 
|-id=103 bgcolor=#E9E9E9
| 5103 Diviš ||  ||  || September 4, 1986 || Kleť || A. Mrkos || PAD || align=right | 12 km || 
|-id=104 bgcolor=#E9E9E9
| 5104 Skripnichenko ||  ||  || September 7, 1986 || Nauchnij || L. I. Chernykh || — || align=right | 9.7 km || 
|-id=105 bgcolor=#E9E9E9
| 5105 Westerhout ||  ||  || October 4, 1986 || Anderson Mesa || E. Bowell || — || align=right | 10 km || 
|-id=106 bgcolor=#d6d6d6
| 5106 Mortensen || 1987 DJ ||  || February 19, 1987 || Brorfelde || P. Jensen || EOS || align=right | 14 km || 
|-id=107 bgcolor=#d6d6d6
| 5107 Laurenbacall ||  ||  || February 24, 1987 || La Silla || H. Debehogne || EOS || align=right | 17 km || 
|-id=108 bgcolor=#fefefe
| 5108 Lübeck ||  ||  || August 21, 1987 || La Silla || E. W. Elst || V || align=right | 4.6 km || 
|-id=109 bgcolor=#fefefe
| 5109 Robertmiller ||  ||  || September 13, 1987 || La Silla || H. Debehogne || — || align=right | 4.7 km || 
|-id=110 bgcolor=#fefefe
| 5110 Belgirate || 1987 SV ||  || September 19, 1987 || Anderson Mesa || E. Bowell || — || align=right | 7.4 km || 
|-id=111 bgcolor=#fefefe
| 5111 Jacliff ||  ||  || September 29, 1987 || Anderson Mesa || E. Bowell || V || align=right | 6.4 km || 
|-id=112 bgcolor=#fefefe
| 5112 Kusaji ||  ||  || September 23, 1987 || Kushiro || S. Ueda, H. Kaneda || FLOmoon || align=right | 3.4 km || 
|-id=113 bgcolor=#E9E9E9
| 5113 Kohno || 1988 BN ||  || January 19, 1988 || Geisei || T. Seki || — || align=right | 7.4 km || 
|-id=114 bgcolor=#fefefe
| 5114 Yezo || 1988 CO ||  || February 15, 1988 || Kushiro || S. Ueda, H. Kaneda || — || align=right | 6.0 km || 
|-id=115 bgcolor=#d6d6d6
| 5115 Frimout ||  ||  || February 13, 1988 || La Silla || E. W. Elst || EOS || align=right | 14 km || 
|-id=116 bgcolor=#d6d6d6
| 5116 Korsør || 1988 EU ||  || March 13, 1988 || Brorfelde || P. Jensen || HYG || align=right | 19 km || 
|-id=117 bgcolor=#d6d6d6
| 5117 Mokotoyama || 1988 GH ||  || April 8, 1988 || Kitami || K. Endate, K. Watanabe || — || align=right | 18 km || 
|-id=118 bgcolor=#E9E9E9
| 5118 Elnapoul || 1988 RB ||  || September 7, 1988 || Brorfelde || P. Jensen || — || align=right | 13 km || 
|-id=119 bgcolor=#C2FFFF
| 5119 Imbrius ||  ||  || September 8, 1988 || Brorfelde || P. Jensen || L5 || align=right | 49 km || 
|-id=120 bgcolor=#C2FFFF
| 5120 Bitias ||  ||  || October 13, 1988 || Palomar || C. S. Shoemaker || L5 || align=right | 48 km || 
|-id=121 bgcolor=#fefefe
| 5121 Numazawa ||  ||  || January 15, 1989 || Kitami || M. Yanai, K. Watanabe || FLO || align=right | 7.2 km || 
|-id=122 bgcolor=#E9E9E9
| 5122 Mucha ||  ||  || January 3, 1989 || Kleť || A. Mrkos || ADE || align=right | 9.2 km || 
|-id=123 bgcolor=#C2FFFF
| 5123 Cynus || 1989 BL ||  || January 28, 1989 || Gekko || Y. Oshima || L4 || align=right | 35 km || 
|-id=124 bgcolor=#fefefe
| 5124 Muraoka || 1989 CW ||  || February 4, 1989 || Geisei || T. Seki || — || align=right | 4.1 km || 
|-id=125 bgcolor=#fefefe
| 5125 Okushiri ||  ||  || February 10, 1989 || Kushiro || S. Ueda, H. Kaneda || — || align=right | 5.6 km || 
|-id=126 bgcolor=#C2FFFF
| 5126 Achaemenides ||  ||  || February 1, 1989 || Palomar || C. S. Shoemaker || L4 || align=right | 52 km || 
|-id=127 bgcolor=#fefefe
| 5127 Bruhns ||  ||  || February 4, 1989 || La Silla || E. W. Elst || — || align=right | 4.1 km || 
|-id=128 bgcolor=#E9E9E9
| 5128 Wakabayashi || 1989 FJ ||  || March 30, 1989 || Ayashi Station || M. Koishikawa || — || align=right | 18 km || 
|-id=129 bgcolor=#fefefe
| 5129 Groom || 1989 GN ||  || April 7, 1989 || Palomar || E. F. Helin || — || align=right | 7.5 km || 
|-id=130 bgcolor=#C2FFFF
| 5130 Ilioneus ||  ||  || September 30, 1989 || Palomar || C. S. Shoemaker || L5 || align=right | 61 km || 
|-id=131 bgcolor=#FFC2E0
| 5131 || 1990 BG || — || January 21, 1990 || Palomar || E. F. Helin, B. Roman || APO +1km || align=right | 3.9 km || 
|-id=132 bgcolor=#E9E9E9
| 5132 Maynard || 1990 ME ||  || June 22, 1990 || Palomar || H. E. Holt || — || align=right | 11 km || 
|-id=133 bgcolor=#E9E9E9
| 5133 Phillipadams || 1990 PA ||  || August 12, 1990 || Siding Spring || R. H. McNaught || — || align=right | 23 km || 
|-id=134 bgcolor=#E9E9E9
| 5134 Ebilson ||  ||  || September 17, 1990 || Palomar || H. E. Holt || — || align=right | 11 km || 
|-id=135 bgcolor=#fefefe
| 5135 Nibutani || 1990 UE ||  || October 16, 1990 || Kushiro || S. Ueda, H. Kaneda || moon || align=right | 4.8 km || 
|-id=136 bgcolor=#d6d6d6
| 5136 Baggaley ||  ||  || October 20, 1990 || Siding Spring || R. H. McNaught || EOS || align=right | 13 km || 
|-id=137 bgcolor=#E9E9E9
| 5137 Frevert || 1990 VC ||  || November 8, 1990 || Chions || J. M. Baur || MAR || align=right | 6.7 km || 
|-id=138 bgcolor=#d6d6d6
| 5138 Gyoda ||  ||  || November 13, 1990 || Okutama || T. Hioki, S. Hayakawa || THM || align=right | 15 km || 
|-id=139 bgcolor=#d6d6d6
| 5139 Rumoi ||  ||  || November 13, 1990 || Kagoshima || M. Mukai, M. Takeishi || KOR || align=right | 12 km || 
|-id=140 bgcolor=#d6d6d6
| 5140 Kida || 1990 XH ||  || December 8, 1990 || Kushiro || S. Ueda, H. Kaneda || — || align=right | 19 km || 
|-id=141 bgcolor=#d6d6d6
| 5141 Tachibana || 1990 YB ||  || December 16, 1990 || Geisei || T. Seki || KAR || align=right | 8.7 km || 
|-id=142 bgcolor=#E9E9E9
| 5142 Okutama || 1990 YD ||  || December 18, 1990 || Okutama || T. Hioki, S. Hayakawa || — || align=right | 6.2 km || 
|-id=143 bgcolor=#FFC2E0
| 5143 Heracles || 1991 VL ||  || November 7, 1991 || Palomar || C. S. Shoemaker || APO +1kmmoon || align=right | 4.8 km || 
|-id=144 bgcolor=#C2FFFF
| 5144 Achates || 1991 XX ||  || December 2, 1991 || Palomar || C. S. Shoemaker || L5 || align=right | 81 km || 
|-id=145 bgcolor=#C7FF8F
| 5145 Pholus || 1992 AD ||  || January 9, 1992 || Kitt Peak || Spacewatch || centaur || align=right | 190 km || 
|-id=146 bgcolor=#E9E9E9
| 5146 Moiwa || 1992 BP ||  || January 28, 1992 || Kushiro || S. Ueda, H. Kaneda || — || align=right | 13 km || 
|-id=147 bgcolor=#E9E9E9
| 5147 Maruyama || 1992 BQ ||  || January 28, 1992 || Kushiro || S. Ueda, H. Kaneda || — || align=right | 7.7 km || 
|-id=148 bgcolor=#d6d6d6
| 5148 Giordano || 5557 P-L ||  || October 17, 1960 || Palomar || PLS || — || align=right | 8.1 km || 
|-id=149 bgcolor=#d6d6d6
| 5149 Leibniz || 6582 P-L ||  || September 24, 1960 || Palomar || PLS || THM || align=right | 14 km || 
|-id=150 bgcolor=#fefefe
| 5150 Fellini || 7571 P-L ||  || October 17, 1960 || Palomar || PLS || — || align=right | 5.4 km || 
|-id=151 bgcolor=#d6d6d6
| 5151 Weerstra || 2160 T-2 ||  || September 29, 1973 || Palomar || PLS || THM || align=right | 11 km || 
|-id=152 bgcolor=#E9E9E9
| 5152 Labs || 1931 UD ||  || October 18, 1931 || Heidelberg || K. Reinmuth || EUN || align=right | 6.7 km || 
|-id=153 bgcolor=#E9E9E9
| 5153 Gierasch || 1940 GO ||  || April 9, 1940 || Turku || Y. Väisälä || — || align=right | 27 km || 
|-id=154 bgcolor=#d6d6d6
| 5154 Leonov ||  ||  || October 8, 1969 || Nauchnij || L. I. Chernykh || — || align=right | 14 km || 
|-id=155 bgcolor=#d6d6d6
| 5155 Denisyuk || 1972 HR ||  || April 18, 1972 || Nauchnij || T. M. Smirnova || HYG || align=right | 15 km || 
|-id=156 bgcolor=#fefefe
| 5156 Golant || 1972 KL ||  || May 18, 1972 || Nauchnij || T. M. Smirnova || — || align=right | 4.9 km || 
|-id=157 bgcolor=#d6d6d6
| 5157 Hindemith ||  ||  || October 27, 1973 || Tautenburg Observatory || F. Börngen || THM || align=right | 14 km || 
|-id=158 bgcolor=#fefefe
| 5158 Ogarev || 1976 YY ||  || December 16, 1976 || Nauchnij || L. I. Chernykh || NYS || align=right | 8.0 km || 
|-id=159 bgcolor=#E9E9E9
| 5159 Burbine || 1977 RG ||  || September 9, 1977 || Harvard Observatory || Harvard Obs. || GEF || align=right | 6.4 km || 
|-id=160 bgcolor=#fefefe
| 5160 Camoes || 1979 YO ||  || December 23, 1979 || La Silla || H. Debehogne, E. R. Netto || — || align=right | 6.0 km || 
|-id=161 bgcolor=#d6d6d6
| 5161 Wightman ||  ||  || October 9, 1980 || Palomar || C. S. Shoemaker || KOR || align=right | 8.4 km || 
|-id=162 bgcolor=#d6d6d6
| 5162 Piemonte || 1982 BW ||  || January 18, 1982 || Anderson Mesa || E. Bowell || EOS || align=right | 17 km || 
|-id=163 bgcolor=#fefefe
| 5163 Vollmayr-Lee ||  ||  || October 9, 1983 || Anderson Mesa || J. Wagner || — || align=right | 6.9 km || 
|-id=164 bgcolor=#d6d6d6
| 5164 Mullo ||  ||  || November 20, 1984 || Caussols || C. Pollas || Tj (2.79) || align=right | 13 km || 
|-id=165 bgcolor=#fefefe
| 5165 Videnom || 1985 CG ||  || February 11, 1985 || Brorfelde || P. Jensen || NYS || align=right | 4.2 km || 
|-id=166 bgcolor=#fefefe
| 5166 Olson ||  ||  || March 22, 1985 || Anderson Mesa || E. Bowell || — || align=right | 11 km || 
|-id=167 bgcolor=#E9E9E9
| 5167 Joeharms ||  ||  || April 11, 1985 || Palomar || C. S. Shoemaker, E. M. Shoemaker || — || align=right | 17 km || 
|-id=168 bgcolor=#fefefe
| 5168 Jenner || 1986 EJ ||  || March 6, 1986 || Palomar || C. S. Shoemaker, E. M. Shoemaker || PHO || align=right | 6.0 km || 
|-id=169 bgcolor=#fefefe
| 5169 Duffell ||  ||  || September 6, 1986 || Anderson Mesa || E. Bowell || NYS || align=right | 4.4 km || 
|-id=170 bgcolor=#d6d6d6
| 5170 Sissons || 1987 EH ||  || March 3, 1987 || Anderson Mesa || E. Bowell || EOS || align=right | 11 km || 
|-id=171 bgcolor=#fefefe
| 5171 Augustesen ||  ||  || September 25, 1987 || Brorfelde || P. Jensen || slow || align=right | 6.4 km || 
|-id=172 bgcolor=#fefefe
| 5172 Yoshiyuki ||  ||  || October 28, 1987 || Kushiro || S. Ueda, H. Kaneda || FLO || align=right | 3.5 km || 
|-id=173 bgcolor=#E9E9E9
| 5173 Stjerneborg ||  ||  || March 13, 1988 || Brorfelde || P. Jensen || — || align=right | 6.0 km || 
|-id=174 bgcolor=#E9E9E9
| 5174 Okugi || 1988 HF ||  || April 16, 1988 || Kitami || M. Yanai, K. Watanabe || RAF || align=right | 5.7 km || 
|-id=175 bgcolor=#fefefe
| 5175 Ables ||  ||  || November 4, 1988 || Palomar || C. S. Shoemaker, E. M. Shoemaker || H || align=right | 4.3 km || 
|-id=176 bgcolor=#E9E9E9
| 5176 Yoichi || 1989 AU ||  || January 4, 1989 || Kushiro || S. Ueda, H. Kaneda || — || align=right | 17 km || 
|-id=177 bgcolor=#fefefe
| 5177 Hugowolf ||  ||  || January 10, 1989 || Tautenburg Observatory || F. Börngen || — || align=right | 8.9 km || 
|-id=178 bgcolor=#fefefe
| 5178 Pattazhy ||  ||  || February 1, 1989 || Kavalur || R. Rajamohan || FLO || align=right | 3.7 km || 
|-id=179 bgcolor=#fefefe
| 5179 Takeshima ||  ||  || March 1, 1989 || Geisei || T. Seki || V || align=right | 4.3 km || 
|-id=180 bgcolor=#fefefe
| 5180 Ohno || 1989 GF ||  || April 6, 1989 || Kitami || T. Fujii, K. Watanabe || — || align=right | 5.3 km || 
|-id=181 bgcolor=#fefefe
| 5181 SURF || 1989 GO ||  || April 7, 1989 || Palomar || E. F. Helin || NYS || align=right | 6.3 km || 
|-id=182 bgcolor=#E9E9E9
| 5182 Bray || 1989 NE ||  || July 1, 1989 || Palomar || E. F. Helin || — || align=right | 9.3 km || 
|-id=183 bgcolor=#E9E9E9
| 5183 Robyn ||  ||  || July 22, 1990 || Palomar || E. F. Helin || — || align=right | 9.0 km || 
|-id=184 bgcolor=#fefefe
| 5184 Cavaillé-Coll ||  ||  || August 16, 1990 || La Silla || E. W. Elst || — || align=right | 4.1 km || 
|-id=185 bgcolor=#E9E9E9
| 5185 Alerossi ||  ||  || September 15, 1990 || Palomar || H. E. Holt || — || align=right | 14 km || 
|-id=186 bgcolor=#E9E9E9
| 5186 Donalu ||  ||  || September 22, 1990 || Palomar || B. Roman || — || align=right | 11 km || 
|-id=187 bgcolor=#d6d6d6
| 5187 Domon ||  ||  || October 15, 1990 || Kitami || K. Endate, K. Watanabe || KOR || align=right | 8.9 km || 
|-id=188 bgcolor=#E9E9E9
| 5188 Paine ||  ||  || October 15, 1990 || Palomar || E. F. Helin || — || align=right | 6.5 km || 
|-id=189 bgcolor=#FFC2E0
| 5189 || 1990 UQ || — || October 20, 1990 || Siding Spring || R. H. McNaught || APO +1kmPHA || align=right data-sort-value="0.93" | 930 m || 
|-id=190 bgcolor=#d6d6d6
| 5190 Fry ||  ||  || October 16, 1990 || Kushiro || S. Ueda, H. Kaneda || — || align=right | 15 km || 
|-id=191 bgcolor=#d6d6d6
| 5191 Paddack ||  ||  || November 13, 1990 || Kushiro || S. Ueda, H. Kaneda || EOS || align=right | 14 km || 
|-id=192 bgcolor=#d6d6d6
| 5192 Yabuki || 1991 CC ||  || February 4, 1991 || Kitami || T. Fujii, K. Watanabe || — || align=right | 32 km || 
|-id=193 bgcolor=#d6d6d6
| 5193 Tanakawataru || 1992 ET ||  || March 7, 1992 || Kushiro || S. Ueda, H. Kaneda || THM || align=right | 22 km || 
|-id=194 bgcolor=#E9E9E9
| 5194 Böttger || 4641 P-L ||  || September 24, 1960 || Palomar || PLS || — || align=right | 7.3 km || 
|-id=195 bgcolor=#fefefe
| 5195 Kaendler || 3289 T-1 ||  || March 26, 1971 || Palomar || PLS || — || align=right | 4.3 km || 
|-id=196 bgcolor=#E9E9E9
| 5196 Bustelli || 3102 T-2 ||  || September 30, 1973 || Palomar || PLS || EUN || align=right | 5.9 km || 
|-id=197 bgcolor=#d6d6d6
| 5197 Rottmann || 4265 T-2 ||  || September 29, 1973 || Palomar || PLS || EOS || align=right | 11 km || 
|-id=198 bgcolor=#d6d6d6
| 5198 Fongyunwah ||  ||  || January 16, 1975 || Nanking || Purple Mountain Obs. || — || align=right | 17 km || 
|-id=199 bgcolor=#E9E9E9
| 5199 Dortmund ||  ||  || September 7, 1981 || Nauchnij || L. G. Karachkina || — || align=right | 8.8 km || 
|-id=200 bgcolor=#fefefe
| 5200 Pamal || 1983 CM ||  || February 11, 1983 || Anderson Mesa || E. Bowell || — || align=right | 3.9 km || 
|}

5201–5300 

|-bgcolor=#d6d6d6
| 5201 Ferraz-Mello || 1983 XF ||  || December 1, 1983 || Anderson Mesa || E. Bowell || 2:1J || align=right | 5.9 km || 
|-id=202 bgcolor=#fefefe
| 5202 Charleseliot || 1983 XX ||  || December 5, 1983 || Kleť || A. Mrkos || slow || align=right | 9.2 km || 
|-id=203 bgcolor=#fefefe
| 5203 Pavarotti ||  ||  || September 27, 1984 || Kleť || Z. Vávrová || — || align=right | 5.0 km || 
|-id=204 bgcolor=#d6d6d6
| 5204 Herakleitos ||  ||  || February 11, 1988 || La Silla || E. W. Elst || THM || align=right | 13 km || 
|-id=205 bgcolor=#fefefe
| 5205 Servián ||  ||  || February 11, 1988 || Kushiro || S. Ueda, H. Kaneda || — || align=right | 5.0 km || 
|-id=206 bgcolor=#E9E9E9
| 5206 Kodomonomori || 1988 ED ||  || March 7, 1988 || Gekko || Y. Oshima || EUN || align=right | 7.4 km || 
|-id=207 bgcolor=#E9E9E9
| 5207 Hearnshaw || 1988 HE ||  || April 15, 1988 || Lake Tekapo || A. C. Gilmore, P. M. Kilmartin || — || align=right | 5.8 km || 
|-id=208 bgcolor=#E9E9E9
| 5208 Royer ||  ||  || February 6, 1989 || Palomar || E. F. Helin || MAR || align=right | 8.1 km || 
|-id=209 bgcolor=#C2FFFF
| 5209 Oloosson ||  ||  || February 13, 1989 || Geisei || T. Seki || L4 || align=right | 48 km || 
|-id=210 bgcolor=#fefefe
| 5210 Saint-Saëns ||  ||  || March 7, 1989 || Tautenburg Observatory || F. Börngen || NYS || align=right | 8.5 km || 
|-id=211 bgcolor=#fefefe
| 5211 Stevenson || 1989 NX ||  || July 8, 1989 || Palomar || C. S. Shoemaker, E. M. Shoemaker || — || align=right | 5.5 km || 
|-id=212 bgcolor=#d6d6d6
| 5212 Celiacruz || 1989 SS ||  || September 29, 1989 || Kushiro || S. Ueda, H. Kaneda || — || align=right | 13 km || 
|-id=213 bgcolor=#d6d6d6
| 5213 Takahashi || 1990 FU ||  || March 18, 1990 || Kitami || K. Endate, K. Watanabe || EOS || align=right | 14 km || 
|-id=214 bgcolor=#fefefe
| 5214 Oozora ||  ||  || November 13, 1990 || Kitami || A. Takahashi, K. Watanabe || — || align=right | 5.2 km || 
|-id=215 bgcolor=#E9E9E9
| 5215 Tsurui || 1991 AE ||  || January 9, 1991 || Kushiro || M. Matsuyama, K. Watanabe || EUN || align=right | 12 km || 
|-id=216 bgcolor=#E9E9E9
| 5216 Cannizzo || 1941 HA ||  || April 16, 1941 || Turku || L. Oterma || EUN || align=right | 11 km || 
|-id=217 bgcolor=#fefefe
| 5217 Chaozhou || 1966 CL ||  || February 13, 1966 || Nanking || Purple Mountain Obs. || NYS || align=right | 4.4 km || 
|-id=218 bgcolor=#fefefe
| 5218 Kutsak ||  ||  || October 9, 1969 || Nauchnij || B. A. Burnasheva || — || align=right | 9.3 km || 
|-id=219 bgcolor=#d6d6d6
| 5219 Zemka ||  ||  || April 2, 1976 || Nauchnij || N. S. Chernykh || THM || align=right | 17 km || 
|-id=220 bgcolor=#fefefe
| 5220 Vika ||  ||  || September 23, 1979 || Nauchnij || N. S. Chernykh || FLO || align=right | 5.1 km || 
|-id=221 bgcolor=#d6d6d6
| 5221 Fabribudweis || 1980 FB ||  || March 16, 1980 || Kleť || L. Brožek || THM || align=right | 14 km || 
|-id=222 bgcolor=#E9E9E9
| 5222 Ioffe ||  ||  || October 11, 1980 || Nauchnij || N. S. Chernykh || PAL || align=right | 18 km || 
|-id=223 bgcolor=#d6d6d6
| 5223 McSween ||  ||  || March 6, 1981 || Siding Spring || S. J. Bus || — || align=right | 13 km || 
|-id=224 bgcolor=#fefefe
| 5224 Abbe ||  ||  || February 21, 1982 || Tautenburg Observatory || F. Börngen || — || align=right | 4.9 km || 
|-id=225 bgcolor=#d6d6d6
| 5225 Loral ||  ||  || October 12, 1983 || Anderson Mesa || E. Bowell || THM || align=right | 15 km || 
|-id=226 bgcolor=#fefefe
| 5226 Pollack || 1983 WL ||  || November 28, 1983 || Anderson Mesa || E. Bowell || — || align=right | 5.5 km || 
|-id=227 bgcolor=#fefefe
| 5227 Bocacara || 1986 PE ||  || August 4, 1986 || Palomar || INAS || — || align=right | 5.2 km || 
|-id=228 bgcolor=#d6d6d6
| 5228 Máca || 1986 VT ||  || November 3, 1986 || Kleť || Z. Vávrová || THM || align=right | 14 km || 
|-id=229 bgcolor=#d6d6d6
| 5229 Irurita ||  ||  || February 23, 1987 || La Silla || H. Debehogne || — || align=right | 18 km || 
|-id=230 bgcolor=#FA8072
| 5230 Asahina || 1988 EF ||  || March 10, 1988 || Palomar || J. Alu || — || align=right | 5.7 km || 
|-id=231 bgcolor=#E9E9E9
| 5231 Verne || 1988 JV ||  || May 9, 1988 || Palomar || C. S. Shoemaker || EUN || align=right | 11 km || 
|-id=232 bgcolor=#d6d6d6
| 5232 Jordaens ||  ||  || August 14, 1988 || Haute-Provence || E. W. Elst || ITH || align=right | 12 km || 
|-id=233 bgcolor=#C2FFFF
| 5233 Nastes ||  ||  || September 14, 1988 || Cerro Tololo || S. J. Bus || L5 || align=right | 29 km || 
|-id=234 bgcolor=#E9E9E9
| 5234 Sechenov || 1989 VP ||  || November 4, 1989 || Nauchnij || L. G. Karachkina || PAL || align=right | 14 km || 
|-id=235 bgcolor=#fefefe
| 5235 Jean-Loup ||  ||  || September 16, 1990 || Palomar || H. E. Holt || FLO || align=right | 6.7 km || 
|-id=236 bgcolor=#fefefe
| 5236 Yoko ||  ||  || October 10, 1990 || Kani || Y. Mizuno, T. Furuta || — || align=right | 8.3 km || 
|-id=237 bgcolor=#fefefe
| 5237 Yoshikawa ||  ||  || October 26, 1990 || Oohira || T. Urata || FLO || align=right | 14 km || 
|-id=238 bgcolor=#fefefe
| 5238 Naozane ||  ||  || November 13, 1990 || Okutama || T. Hioki, S. Hayakawa || FLO || align=right | 5.9 km || 
|-id=239 bgcolor=#E9E9E9
| 5239 Reiki ||  ||  || November 14, 1990 || Yatsugatake || S. Izumikawa, O. Muramatsu || — || align=right | 10 km || 
|-id=240 bgcolor=#fefefe
| 5240 Kwasan || 1990 XE ||  || December 7, 1990 || Toyota || K. Suzuki, T. Urata || V || align=right | 7.0 km || 
|-id=241 bgcolor=#d6d6d6
| 5241 Beeson || 1990 YL ||  || December 23, 1990 || Kushiro || S. Ueda, H. Kaneda || — || align=right | 16 km || 
|-id=242 bgcolor=#E9E9E9
| 5242 Kenreimonin || 1991 BO ||  || January 18, 1991 || Karasuyama || S. Inoda, T. Urata || AGN || align=right | 7.5 km || 
|-id=243 bgcolor=#E9E9E9
| 5243 Clasien || 1246 T-2 ||  || September 29, 1973 || Palomar || PLS || DOR || align=right | 14 km || 
|-id=244 bgcolor=#C2FFFF
| 5244 Amphilochos ||  ||  || September 29, 1973 || Palomar || PLS || L4 || align=right | 37 km || 
|-id=245 bgcolor=#fefefe
| 5245 Maslyakov ||  ||  || April 1, 1976 || Nauchnij || N. S. Chernykh || — || align=right | 4.0 km || 
|-id=246 bgcolor=#FA8072
| 5246 Migliorini || 1979 OB ||  || July 26, 1979 || Anderson Mesa || E. Bowell || — || align=right | 3.8 km || 
|-id=247 bgcolor=#fefefe
| 5247 Krylov ||  ||  || October 20, 1982 || Nauchnij || L. G. Karachkina || PHO || align=right | 7.7 km || 
|-id=248 bgcolor=#fefefe
| 5248 Scardia || 1983 GQ ||  || April 6, 1983 || La Silla || H. Debehogne, G. DeSanctis || — || align=right | 4.2 km || 
|-id=249 bgcolor=#d6d6d6
| 5249 Giza || 1983 HJ ||  || April 18, 1983 || Anderson Mesa || N. G. Thomas || THM || align=right | 21 km || 
|-id=250 bgcolor=#E9E9E9
| 5250 Jas || 1984 QF ||  || August 21, 1984 || Kleť || A. Mrkos || EUN || align=right | 7.1 km || 
|-id=251 bgcolor=#FA8072
| 5251 Bradwood || 1985 KA ||  || May 18, 1985 || Lake Tekapo || A. C. Gilmore, P. M. Kilmartin || PHO || align=right | 4.8 km || 
|-id=252 bgcolor=#fefefe
| 5252 Vikrymov ||  ||  || August 13, 1985 || Nauchnij || N. S. Chernykh || — || align=right | 3.1 km || 
|-id=253 bgcolor=#FA8072
| 5253 Fredclifford || 1985 XB ||  || December 15, 1985 || Palomar || S. Singer-Brewster || H || align=right | 2.4 km || 
|-id=254 bgcolor=#C2FFFF
| 5254 Ulysses ||  ||  || November 7, 1986 || Haute-Provence || E. W. Elst || L4 || align=right | 76 km || 
|-id=255 bgcolor=#E9E9E9
| 5255 Johnsophie || 1988 KF ||  || May 19, 1988 || Palomar || E. F. Helin || — || align=right | 14 km || 
|-id=256 bgcolor=#E9E9E9
| 5256 Farquhar || 1988 NN ||  || July 11, 1988 || Palomar || E. F. Helin, C. Mikolajczak, R. Coker || — || align=right | 12 km || 
|-id=257 bgcolor=#C2FFFF
| 5257 Laogonus ||  ||  || September 14, 1988 || Cerro Tololo || S. J. Bus || L5 || align=right | 23 km || 
|-id=258 bgcolor=#C2FFFF
| 5258 Rhoeo ||  ||  || January 1, 1989 || Gekko || Y. Oshima || L4ERY || align=right | 53 km || 
|-id=259 bgcolor=#C2FFFF
| 5259 Epeigeus ||  ||  || January 30, 1989 || Palomar || C. S. Shoemaker, E. M. Shoemaker || L4 || align=right | 45 km || 
|-id=260 bgcolor=#E9E9E9
| 5260 Philvéron || 1989 RH ||  || September 2, 1989 || Haute-Provence || E. W. Elst || EUN || align=right | 6.5 km || 
|-id=261 bgcolor=#FA8072
| 5261 Eureka || 1990 MB ||  || June 20, 1990 || Palomar || D. H. Levy, H. E. Holt || moon || align=right | 1.9 km || 
|-id=262 bgcolor=#d6d6d6
| 5262 Brucegoldberg ||  ||  || December 14, 1990 || Palomar || E. F. Helin || — || align=right | 33 km || 
|-id=263 bgcolor=#d6d6d6
| 5263 Arrius ||  ||  || April 13, 1991 || Siding Spring || D. I. Steel || — || align=right | 26 km || 
|-id=264 bgcolor=#C2FFFF
| 5264 Telephus || 1991 KC ||  || May 17, 1991 || Palomar || C. S. Shoemaker, E. M. Shoemaker || L4 || align=right | 68 km || 
|-id=265 bgcolor=#d6d6d6
| 5265 Schadow || 2570 P-L ||  || September 24, 1960 || Palomar || PLS || HYG || align=right | 10 km || 
|-id=266 bgcolor=#E9E9E9
| 5266 Rauch || 4047 T-2 ||  || September 29, 1973 || Palomar || PLS || — || align=right | 11 km || 
|-id=267 bgcolor=#fefefe
| 5267 Zegmott || 1966 CF ||  || February 13, 1966 || Nanking || Purple Mountain Obs. || — || align=right | 4.6 km || 
|-id=268 bgcolor=#E9E9E9
| 5268 Černohorský ||  ||  || October 26, 1971 || Hamburg-Bergedorf || L. Kohoutek || — || align=right | 8.8 km || 
|-id=269 bgcolor=#fefefe
| 5269 Paustovskij ||  ||  || September 28, 1978 || Nauchnij || N. S. Chernykh || — || align=right | 3.7 km || 
|-id=270 bgcolor=#E9E9E9
| 5270 Kakabadze || 1979 KR ||  || May 19, 1979 || La Silla || R. M. West || — || align=right | 8.0 km || 
|-id=271 bgcolor=#E9E9E9
| 5271 Kaylamaya ||  ||  || June 25, 1979 || Siding Spring || E. F. Helin, S. J. Bus || EUN || align=right | 4.7 km || 
|-id=272 bgcolor=#fefefe
| 5272 Dickinson ||  ||  || August 30, 1981 || Anderson Mesa || E. Bowell || FLO || align=right | 3.3 km || 
|-id=273 bgcolor=#fefefe
| 5273 Peilisheng ||  ||  || February 16, 1982 || Xinglong || Purple Mountain Obs. || V || align=right | 4.5 km || 
|-id=274 bgcolor=#E9E9E9
| 5274 Degewij || 1985 RS ||  || September 14, 1985 || Anderson Mesa || E. Bowell || ADE || align=right | 16 km || 
|-id=275 bgcolor=#FA8072
| 5275 Zdislava || 1986 UU ||  || October 28, 1986 || Kleť || Z. Vávrová || — || align=right | 5.0 km || 
|-id=276 bgcolor=#E9E9E9
| 5276 Gulkis || 1987 GK ||  || April 1, 1987 || Palomar || E. F. Helin || — || align=right | 9.8 km || 
|-id=277 bgcolor=#fefefe
| 5277 Brisbane || 1988 DO ||  || February 22, 1988 || Siding Spring || R. H. McNaught || — || align=right | 3.0 km || 
|-id=278 bgcolor=#fefefe
| 5278 Polly ||  ||  || March 12, 1988 || Palomar || E. F. Helin || FLO || align=right | 4.4 km || 
|-id=279 bgcolor=#fefefe
| 5279 Arthuradel || 1988 LA ||  || June 8, 1988 || Palomar || T. Rodriquez || — || align=right | 7.6 km || 
|-id=280 bgcolor=#E9E9E9
| 5280 Andrewbecker || 1988 PT ||  || August 11, 1988 || Palomar || C. Mikolajczak, R. Coker || — || align=right | 11 km || 
|-id=281 bgcolor=#d6d6d6
| 5281 Lindstrom ||  ||  || September 6, 1988 || Cerro Tololo || S. J. Bus || EOS || align=right | 17 km || 
|-id=282 bgcolor=#E9E9E9
| 5282 Yamatotakeru || 1988 VT ||  || November 2, 1988 || Gekko || Y. Oshima || — || align=right | 5.9 km || 
|-id=283 bgcolor=#C2FFFF
| 5283 Pyrrhus || 1989 BW ||  || January 31, 1989 || Palomar || C. S. Shoemaker || L4 || align=right | 48 km || 
|-id=284 bgcolor=#C2FFFF
| 5284 Orsilocus ||  ||  || February 1, 1989 || Palomar || C. S. Shoemaker, E. M. Shoemaker || L4 || align=right | 50 km || 
|-id=285 bgcolor=#C2FFFF
| 5285 Krethon ||  ||  || March 9, 1989 || Palomar || C. S. Shoemaker, E. M. Shoemaker || L4 || align=right | 50 km || 
|-id=286 bgcolor=#d6d6d6
| 5286 Haruomukai ||  ||  || November 4, 1989 || Kagoshima || M. Mukai, M. Takeishi || — || align=right | 9.1 km || 
|-id=287 bgcolor=#E9E9E9
| 5287 Heishu || 1989 WE ||  || November 20, 1989 || Kani || Y. Mizuno, T. Furuta || — || align=right | 8.3 km || 
|-id=288 bgcolor=#E9E9E9
| 5288 Nankichi || 1989 XD ||  || December 3, 1989 || Kani || Y. Mizuno, T. Furuta || EUN || align=right | 8.7 km || 
|-id=289 bgcolor=#d6d6d6
| 5289 Niemela ||  ||  || May 28, 1990 || El Leoncito || Félix Aguilar Obs. || EOS || align=right | 9.9 km || 
|-id=290 bgcolor=#E9E9E9
| 5290 Langevin ||  ||  || July 30, 1990 || Palomar || H. E. Holt || — || align=right | 18 km || 
|-id=291 bgcolor=#fefefe
| 5291 Yuuko || 1990 YT ||  || December 20, 1990 || Kushiro || M. Matsuyama, K. Watanabe || NYS || align=right | 5.3 km || 
|-id=292 bgcolor=#E9E9E9
| 5292 Mackwell ||  ||  || January 12, 1991 || Fujieda || H. Shiozawa, M. Kizawa || MAR || align=right | 9.4 km || 
|-id=293 bgcolor=#E9E9E9
| 5293 Bentengahama ||  ||  || January 23, 1991 || Kushiro || M. Matsuyama, K. Watanabe || EUN || align=right | 12 km || 
|-id=294 bgcolor=#d6d6d6
| 5294 Onnetoh || 1991 CB ||  || February 3, 1991 || Kitami || K. Endate, K. Watanabe || — || align=right | 13 km || 
|-id=295 bgcolor=#d6d6d6
| 5295 Masayo || 1991 CE ||  || February 5, 1991 || Kani || Y. Mizuno, T. Furuta || HYG || align=right | 21 km || 
|-id=296 bgcolor=#d6d6d6
| 5296 Friedrich || 9546 P-L ||  || October 17, 1960 || Palomar || PLS || THM || align=right | 19 km || 
|-id=297 bgcolor=#fefefe
| 5297 Schinkel || 4170 T-2 ||  || September 29, 1973 || Palomar || PLS || FLO || align=right | 5.1 km || 
|-id=298 bgcolor=#d6d6d6
| 5298 Paraskevopoulos || 1966 PK ||  || August 7, 1966 || Bloemfontein || Boyden Obs. || — || align=right | 9.4 km || 
|-id=299 bgcolor=#d6d6d6
| 5299 Bittesini || 1969 LB ||  || June 8, 1969 || El Leoncito || C. U. Cesco || — || align=right | 18 km || 
|-id=300 bgcolor=#fefefe
| 5300 Sats ||  ||  || September 19, 1974 || Nauchnij || L. I. Chernykh || — || align=right | 3.9 km || 
|}

5301–5400 

|-bgcolor=#d6d6d6
| 5301 Novobranets ||  ||  || September 20, 1974 || Nauchnij || L. V. Zhuravleva || 7:4 || align=right | 21 km || 
|-id=302 bgcolor=#fefefe
| 5302 Romanoserra ||  ||  || December 18, 1976 || Nauchnij || N. S. Chernykh || — || align=right | 5.2 km || 
|-id=303 bgcolor=#d6d6d6
| 5303 Parijskij ||  ||  || October 3, 1978 || Nauchnij || N. S. Chernykh || KOR || align=right | 8.6 km || 
|-id=304 bgcolor=#d6d6d6
| 5304 Bazhenov ||  ||  || October 2, 1978 || Nauchnij || L. V. Zhuravleva || — || align=right | 18 km || 
|-id=305 bgcolor=#fefefe
| 5305 Bernievolz ||  ||  || November 7, 1978 || Palomar || E. F. Helin, S. J. Bus || NYS || align=right | 5.3 km || 
|-id=306 bgcolor=#d6d6d6
| 5306 Fangfen || 1980 BB ||  || January 25, 1980 || Harvard Observatory || Harvard Obs. || KOR || align=right | 8.3 km || 
|-id=307 bgcolor=#fefefe
| 5307 Paul-André || 1980 YC ||  || December 30, 1980 || Anderson Mesa || E. Bowell || V || align=right | 4.0 km || 
|-id=308 bgcolor=#E9E9E9
| 5308 Hutchison ||  ||  || February 28, 1981 || Siding Spring || S. J. Bus || — || align=right | 5.7 km || 
|-id=309 bgcolor=#fefefe
| 5309 MacPherson ||  ||  || March 2, 1981 || Siding Spring || S. J. Bus || — || align=right | 3.9 km || 
|-id=310 bgcolor=#fefefe
| 5310 Papike ||  ||  || March 2, 1981 || Siding Spring || S. J. Bus || V || align=right | 3.0 km || 
|-id=311 bgcolor=#d6d6d6
| 5311 Rutherford ||  ||  || April 3, 1981 || Lake Tekapo || A. C. Gilmore, P. M. Kilmartin || — || align=right | 9.3 km || 
|-id=312 bgcolor=#d6d6d6
| 5312 Schott ||  ||  || November 3, 1981 || Tautenburg Observatory || F. Börngen || — || align=right | 7.8 km || 
|-id=313 bgcolor=#fefefe
| 5313 Nunes ||  ||  || September 18, 1982 || La Silla || H. Debehogne || FLO || align=right | 5.5 km || 
|-id=314 bgcolor=#d6d6d6
| 5314 Wilkickia ||  ||  || September 20, 1982 || Nauchnij || N. S. Chernykh || EOS || align=right | 12 km || 
|-id=315 bgcolor=#fefefe
| 5315 Balʹmont ||  ||  || September 16, 1982 || Nauchnij || L. I. Chernykh || FLO || align=right | 3.4 km || 
|-id=316 bgcolor=#d6d6d6
| 5316 Filatov ||  ||  || October 21, 1982 || Nauchnij || L. G. Karachkina || slow? || align=right | 46 km || 
|-id=317 bgcolor=#E9E9E9
| 5317 Verolacqua || 1983 CE ||  || February 11, 1983 || Palomar || C. S. Shoemaker || EUN || align=right | 9.4 km || 
|-id=318 bgcolor=#fefefe
| 5318 Dientzenhofer ||  ||  || April 21, 1985 || Kleť || A. Mrkos || — || align=right | 6.3 km || 
|-id=319 bgcolor=#fefefe
| 5319 Petrovskaya ||  ||  || September 15, 1985 || Nauchnij || N. S. Chernykh || — || align=right | 4.9 km || 
|-id=320 bgcolor=#d6d6d6
| 5320 Lisbeth || 1985 VD ||  || November 14, 1985 || Brorfelde || P. Jensen, K. Augustesen, H. J. Fogh Olsen || — || align=right | 17 km || 
|-id=321 bgcolor=#E9E9E9
| 5321 Jagras || 1985 VN ||  || November 14, 1985 || Brorfelde || P. Jensen, K. Augustesen, H. J. Fogh Olsen || — || align=right | 7.1 km || 
|-id=322 bgcolor=#d6d6d6
| 5322 Ghaffari ||  ||  || August 26, 1986 || La Silla || H. Debehogne || KOR || align=right | 11 km || 
|-id=323 bgcolor=#fefefe
| 5323 Fogh ||  ||  || October 13, 1986 || Brorfelde || P. Jensen || NYS || align=right | 5.5 km || 
|-id=324 bgcolor=#FFC2E0
| 5324 Lyapunov || 1987 SL ||  || September 22, 1987 || Nauchnij || L. G. Karachkina || AMO +1km || align=right | 2.8 km || 
|-id=325 bgcolor=#fefefe
| 5325 Silver || 1988 JQ ||  || May 12, 1988 || Palomar || C. S. Shoemaker || PHO || align=right | 9.4 km || 
|-id=326 bgcolor=#E9E9E9
| 5326 Vittoriosacco ||  ||  || September 8, 1988 || La Silla || H. Debehogne || MAR || align=right | 7.4 km || 
|-id=327 bgcolor=#fefefe
| 5327 Gertwilkens ||  ||  || March 5, 1989 || Kleť || Z. Vávrová || KLI || align=right | 12 km || 
|-id=328 bgcolor=#fefefe
| 5328 Nisiyamakoiti ||  ||  || October 26, 1989 || Kushiro || S. Ueda, H. Kaneda || — || align=right | 4.5 km || 
|-id=329 bgcolor=#E9E9E9
| 5329 Decaro || 1989 YP ||  || December 21, 1989 || Siding Spring || R. H. McNaught || JUN || align=right | 11 km || 
|-id=330 bgcolor=#E9E9E9
| 5330 Senrikyu ||  ||  || January 21, 1990 || Dynic || A. Sugie || PAL || align=right | 17 km || 
|-id=331 bgcolor=#E9E9E9
| 5331 Erimomisaki ||  ||  || January 27, 1990 || Kitami || K. Endate, K. Watanabe || — || align=right | 9.2 km || 
|-id=332 bgcolor=#FFC2E0
| 5332 Davidaguilar || 1990 DA ||  || February 16, 1990 || Dynic || A. Sugie || AMO +1km || align=right | 3.6 km || 
|-id=333 bgcolor=#fefefe
| 5333 Kanaya || 1990 UH ||  || October 18, 1990 || Susono || M. Akiyama, T. Furuta || CHL || align=right | 14 km || 
|-id=334 bgcolor=#fefefe
| 5334 Mishima || 1991 CF ||  || February 8, 1991 || Susono || M. Akiyama, T. Furuta || — || align=right | 6.2 km || 
|-id=335 bgcolor=#C7FF8F
| 5335 Damocles || 1991 DA ||  || February 18, 1991 || Siding Spring || R. H. McNaught || damocloidunusualcritical || align=right | 9.7 km || 
|-id=336 bgcolor=#d6d6d6
| 5336 Kley ||  ||  || May 7, 1991 || Uenohara || N. Kawasato || — || align=right | 25 km || 
|-id=337 bgcolor=#d6d6d6
| 5337 Aoki || 1991 LD ||  || June 6, 1991 || Kiyosato || S. Otomo, O. Muramatsu || — || align=right | 31 km || 
|-id=338 bgcolor=#d6d6d6
| 5338 Michelblanc ||  ||  || September 13, 1991 || Palomar || H. E. Holt || KOR || align=right | 9.9 km || 
|-id=339 bgcolor=#d6d6d6
| 5339 Desmars || 1992 CD ||  || February 4, 1992 || Okutama || T. Hioki, S. Hayakawa || — || align=right | 16 km || 
|-id=340 bgcolor=#d6d6d6
| 5340 Burton || 4027 P-L ||  || September 24, 1960 || Palomar || PLS || — || align=right | 15 km || 
|-id=341 bgcolor=#fefefe
| 5341 Purgathofer || 6040 P-L ||  || September 24, 1960 || Palomar || PLS || — || align=right | 2.9 km || 
|-id=342 bgcolor=#fefefe
| 5342 Le Poole || 3129 T-2 ||  || September 30, 1973 || Palomar || PLS || — || align=right | 5.2 km || 
|-id=343 bgcolor=#fefefe
| 5343 Ryzhov ||  ||  || September 23, 1977 || Nauchnij || N. S. Chernykh || — || align=right | 5.1 km || 
|-id=344 bgcolor=#E9E9E9
| 5344 Ryabov || 1978 RN ||  || September 1, 1978 || Nauchnij || N. S. Chernykh || — || align=right | 11 km || 
|-id=345 bgcolor=#E9E9E9
| 5345 Boynton ||  ||  || March 1, 1981 || Siding Spring || S. J. Bus || DOR || align=right | 8.8 km || 
|-id=346 bgcolor=#d6d6d6
| 5346 Benedetti ||  ||  || August 24, 1981 || La Silla || H. Debehogne || THM || align=right | 16 km || 
|-id=347 bgcolor=#d6d6d6
| 5347 Orestelesca ||  ||  || February 24, 1985 || Palomar || E. F. Helin || EOS || align=right | 11 km || 
|-id=348 bgcolor=#E9E9E9
| 5348 Kennoguchi || 1988 BB ||  || January 16, 1988 || Chiyoda || T. Kojima || DOR || align=right | 15 km || 
|-id=349 bgcolor=#FA8072
| 5349 Paulharris || 1988 RA ||  || September 7, 1988 || Palomar || E. F. Helin || — || align=right | 13 km || 
|-id=350 bgcolor=#fefefe
| 5350 Epetersen ||  ||  || April 3, 1989 || La Silla || E. W. Elst || — || align=right | 5.9 km || 
|-id=351 bgcolor=#fefefe
| 5351 Diderot ||  ||  || September 26, 1989 || La Silla || E. W. Elst || — || align=right | 3.7 km || 
|-id=352 bgcolor=#fefefe
| 5352 Fujita || 1989 YN ||  || December 27, 1989 || Yatsugatake || Y. Kushida, O. Muramatsu || — || align=right | 4.2 km || 
|-id=353 bgcolor=#E9E9E9
| 5353 Baillié || 1989 YT ||  || December 20, 1989 || Gekko || Y. Oshima || — || align=right | 5.3 km || 
|-id=354 bgcolor=#d6d6d6
| 5354 Hisayo ||  ||  || January 30, 1990 || Kushiro || S. Ueda, H. Kaneda || — || align=right | 16 km || 
|-id=355 bgcolor=#fefefe
| 5355 Akihiro || 1991 CA ||  || February 3, 1991 || Kushiro || S. Ueda, H. Kaneda || — || align=right | 5.8 km || 
|-id=356 bgcolor=#E9E9E9
| 5356 Neagari ||  ||  || March 21, 1991 || Kitami || K. Endate, K. Watanabe || — || align=right | 9.9 km || 
|-id=357 bgcolor=#d6d6d6
| 5357 Sekiguchi || 1992 EL ||  || March 2, 1992 || Kitami || T. Fujii, K. Watanabe || EOS || align=right | 14 km || 
|-id=358 bgcolor=#d6d6d6
| 5358 Meineko || 1992 QH ||  || August 26, 1992 || Kushiro || S. Ueda, H. Kaneda || ITH || align=right | 14 km || 
|-id=359 bgcolor=#fefefe
| 5359 Markzakharov ||  ||  || August 24, 1974 || Nauchnij || L. I. Chernykh || — || align=right | 4.4 km || 
|-id=360 bgcolor=#d6d6d6
| 5360 Rozhdestvenskij ||  ||  || November 8, 1975 || Nauchnij || N. S. Chernykh || ALA || align=right | 28 km || 
|-id=361 bgcolor=#d6d6d6
| 5361 Goncharov ||  ||  || December 16, 1976 || Nauchnij || L. I. Chernykh || — || align=right | 24 km || 
|-id=362 bgcolor=#d6d6d6
| 5362 Johnyoung || 1978 CH ||  || February 2, 1978 || Palomar || J. Gibson || 7:4 || align=right | 22 km || 
|-id=363 bgcolor=#fefefe
| 5363 Kupka || 1979 UQ ||  || October 19, 1979 || Kleť || A. Mrkos || — || align=right | 6.1 km || 
|-id=364 bgcolor=#fefefe
| 5364 Christophschäfer ||  ||  || September 2, 1980 || Kleť || Z. Vávrová || — || align=right | 12 km || 
|-id=365 bgcolor=#fefefe
| 5365 Fievez ||  ||  || March 7, 1981 || La Silla || H. Debehogne, G. DeSanctis || — || align=right | 2.8 km || 
|-id=366 bgcolor=#fefefe
| 5366 Rhianjones ||  ||  || March 2, 1981 || Siding Spring || S. J. Bus || — || align=right | 4.2 km || 
|-id=367 bgcolor=#d6d6d6
| 5367 Sollenberger || 1982 TT ||  || October 13, 1982 || Anderson Mesa || E. Bowell || — || align=right | 13 km || 
|-id=368 bgcolor=#d6d6d6
| 5368 Vitagliano ||  ||  || September 21, 1984 || La Silla || H. Debehogne || 3:2 || align=right | 35 km || 
|-id=369 bgcolor=#fefefe
| 5369 Virgiugum ||  ||  || September 22, 1985 || Zimmerwald || P. Wild || — || align=right | 4.5 km || 
|-id=370 bgcolor=#FFC2E0
| 5370 Taranis || 1986 RA ||  || September 2, 1986 || Palomar || A. Maury || AMO +1km2:1Jcritical || align=right | 3.6 km || 
|-id=371 bgcolor=#d6d6d6
| 5371 ||  || — || November 15, 1987 || Kushiro || S. Ueda, H. Kaneda || — || align=right | 18 km || 
|-id=372 bgcolor=#d6d6d6
| 5372 Bikki || 1987 WS ||  || November 29, 1987 || Kitami || K. Endate, K. Watanabe || — || align=right | 9.7 km || 
|-id=373 bgcolor=#E9E9E9
| 5373 ||  || — || November 14, 1988 || Kushiro || S. Ueda, H. Kaneda || — || align=right | 9.2 km || 
|-id=374 bgcolor=#d6d6d6
| 5374 Hokutosei ||  ||  || January 4, 1989 || Kitami || M. Yanai, K. Watanabe || — || align=right | 39 km || 
|-id=375 bgcolor=#d6d6d6
| 5375 Siedentopf ||  ||  || January 11, 1989 || Tautenburg Observatory || F. Börngen || THM || align=right | 10 km || 
|-id=376 bgcolor=#fefefe
| 5376 || 1990 DD || — || February 16, 1990 || Kushiro || S. Ueda, H. Kaneda || — || align=right | 8.9 km || 
|-id=377 bgcolor=#fefefe
| 5377 Komori || 1991 FM ||  || March 17, 1991 || Kiyosato || S. Otomo, O. Muramatsu || — || align=right | 3.9 km || 
|-id=378 bgcolor=#fefefe
| 5378 Ellyett || 1991 GD ||  || April 9, 1991 || Siding Spring || R. H. McNaught || H || align=right | 3.0 km || 
|-id=379 bgcolor=#fefefe
| 5379 Abehiroshi || 1991 HG ||  || April 16, 1991 || Kiyosato || S. Otomo, O. Muramatsu || — || align=right | 6.3 km || 
|-id=380 bgcolor=#E9E9E9
| 5380 Sprigg || 1991 JT ||  || May 7, 1991 || Siding Spring || R. H. McNaught || — || align=right | 6.6 km || 
|-id=381 bgcolor=#FFC2E0
| 5381 Sekhmet || 1991 JY ||  || May 14, 1991 || Palomar || C. S. Shoemaker || ATE +1kmmoon || align=right data-sort-value="0.94" | 940 m || 
|-id=382 bgcolor=#E9E9E9
| 5382 McKay ||  ||  || May 8, 1991 || Siding Spring || R. H. McNaught || — || align=right | 10 km || 
|-id=383 bgcolor=#d6d6d6
| 5383 Leavitt || 4293 T-2 ||  || September 29, 1973 || Palomar || PLS || KOR || align=right | 7.5 km || 
|-id=384 bgcolor=#fefefe
| 5384 Changjiangcun || 1957 VA ||  || November 11, 1957 || Nanking || C.-H. Chang || H || align=right | 8.2 km || 
|-id=385 bgcolor=#d6d6d6
| 5385 Kamenka ||  ||  || October 3, 1975 || Nauchnij || L. I. Chernykh || — || align=right | 17 km || 
|-id=386 bgcolor=#fefefe
| 5386 Bajaja ||  ||  || October 1, 1975 || El Leoncito || Félix Aguilar Obs. || — || align=right | 6.6 km || 
|-id=387 bgcolor=#fefefe
| 5387 Casleo || 1980 NB ||  || July 11, 1980 || Cerro El Roble || Cerro El Roble Stn. || NYS || align=right | 5.5 km || 
|-id=388 bgcolor=#E9E9E9
| 5388 Mottola ||  ||  || March 5, 1981 || La Silla || H. Debehogne, G. DeSanctis || — || align=right | 7.5 km || 
|-id=389 bgcolor=#fefefe
| 5389 Choikaiyau ||  ||  || October 29, 1981 || Nanking || Purple Mountain Obs. || — || align=right | 4.5 km || 
|-id=390 bgcolor=#fefefe
| 5390 Huichiming ||  ||  || December 19, 1981 || Nanking || Purple Mountain Obs. || Hslow || align=right | 3.4 km || 
|-id=391 bgcolor=#fefefe
| 5391 Emmons ||  ||  || September 13, 1985 || Palomar || E. F. Helin || — || align=right | 5.6 km || 
|-id=392 bgcolor=#FA8072
| 5392 Parker || 1986 AK ||  || January 12, 1986 || Palomar || C. S. Shoemaker || — || align=right | 7.1 km || 
|-id=393 bgcolor=#fefefe
| 5393 Goldstein || 1986 ET ||  || March 5, 1986 || Anderson Mesa || E. Bowell || FLO || align=right | 4.2 km || 
|-id=394 bgcolor=#fefefe
| 5394 Jurgens ||  ||  || March 6, 1986 || Anderson Mesa || E. Bowell || NYS || align=right | 4.9 km || 
|-id=395 bgcolor=#E9E9E9
| 5395 Shosasaki ||  ||  || September 14, 1988 || Cerro Tololo || S. J. Bus || — || align=right | 2.9 km || 
|-id=396 bgcolor=#fefefe
| 5396 ||  || — || September 20, 1988 || La Silla || H. Debehogne || — || align=right | 5.1 km || 
|-id=397 bgcolor=#E9E9E9
| 5397 Vojislava ||  ||  || November 14, 1988 || Gekko || Y. Oshima || EUN || align=right | 11 km || 
|-id=398 bgcolor=#d6d6d6
| 5398 ||  || — || January 13, 1989 || Kushiro || S. Ueda, H. Kaneda || — || align=right | 10 km || 
|-id=399 bgcolor=#E9E9E9
| 5399 Awa || 1989 BT ||  || January 29, 1989 || Tokushima || M. Iwamoto, T. Furuta || — || align=right | 17 km || 
|-id=400 bgcolor=#d6d6d6
| 5400 || 1989 CM || — || February 4, 1989 || Kushiro || S. Ueda, H. Kaneda || THM || align=right | 11 km || 
|}

5401–5500 

|-bgcolor=#E9E9E9
| 5401 Minamioda || 1989 EV ||  || March 6, 1989 || Minami-Oda || T. Nomura, K. Kawanishi || GEF || align=right | 9.6 km || 
|-id=402 bgcolor=#fefefe
| 5402 Kejosmith ||  ||  || October 27, 1989 || Palomar || E. F. Helin || moon || align=right | 4.2 km || 
|-id=403 bgcolor=#d6d6d6
| 5403 Takachiho || 1990 DM ||  || February 20, 1990 || Yatsugatake || Y. Kushida, M. Inoue || — || align=right | 15 km || 
|-id=404 bgcolor=#fefefe
| 5404 Uemura ||  ||  || March 15, 1991 || Kitami || K. Endate, K. Watanabe || — || align=right | 5.7 km || 
|-id=405 bgcolor=#E9E9E9
| 5405 Neverland || 1991 GY ||  || April 11, 1991 || Yatsugatake || Y. Kushida, O. Muramatsu || — || align=right | 13 km || 
|-id=406 bgcolor=#E9E9E9
| 5406 Jonjoseph ||  ||  || August 9, 1991 || Palomar || H. E. Holt || — || align=right | 17 km || 
|-id=407 bgcolor=#FA8072
| 5407 || 1992 AX || — || January 4, 1992 || Kushiro || S. Ueda, H. Kaneda || moon || align=right | 2.8 km || 
|-id=408 bgcolor=#fefefe
| 5408 Thé || 1232 T-1 ||  || March 25, 1971 || Palomar || PLS || — || align=right | 4.2 km || 
|-id=409 bgcolor=#E9E9E9
| 5409 Saale || 1962 SR ||  || September 30, 1962 || Tautenburg Observatory || F. Börngen || — || align=right | 6.8 km || 
|-id=410 bgcolor=#d6d6d6
| 5410 Spivakov || 1967 DA ||  || February 16, 1967 || Nauchnij || T. M. Smirnova || — || align=right | 9.6 km || 
|-id=411 bgcolor=#d6d6d6
| 5411 Liia ||  ||  || January 2, 1973 || Nauchnij || N. S. Chernykh || — || align=right | 19 km || 
|-id=412 bgcolor=#fefefe
| 5412 Rou ||  ||  || September 25, 1973 || Nauchnij || L. V. Zhuravleva || NYS || align=right | 4.9 km || 
|-id=413 bgcolor=#d6d6d6
| 5413 Smyslov ||  ||  || March 13, 1977 || Nauchnij || N. S. Chernykh || THM || align=right | 18 km || 
|-id=414 bgcolor=#d6d6d6
| 5414 Sokolov ||  ||  || September 11, 1977 || Nauchnij || N. S. Chernykh || KOR || align=right | 7.6 km || 
|-id=415 bgcolor=#fefefe
| 5415 Lyanzuridi ||  ||  || October 3, 1978 || Nauchnij || N. S. Chernykh || FLO || align=right | 4.6 km || 
|-id=416 bgcolor=#E9E9E9
| 5416 Estremadoyro ||  ||  || November 7, 1978 || Palomar || E. F. Helin, S. J. Bus || DOR || align=right | 19 km || 
|-id=417 bgcolor=#fefefe
| 5417 Solovaya || 1981 QT ||  || August 24, 1981 || Kleť || L. Brožek || — || align=right | 5.7 km || 
|-id=418 bgcolor=#d6d6d6
| 5418 Joyce ||  ||  || August 29, 1981 || Kleť || A. Mrkos || — || align=right | 14 km || 
|-id=419 bgcolor=#d6d6d6
| 5419 Benua ||  ||  || September 29, 1981 || Nauchnij || L. V. Zhuravleva || — || align=right | 14 km || 
|-id=420 bgcolor=#E9E9E9
| 5420 Jancis ||  ||  || May 15, 1982 || Palomar || Palomar Obs. || — || align=right | 12 km || 
|-id=421 bgcolor=#fefefe
| 5421 Ulanova ||  ||  || October 14, 1982 || Nauchnij || L. V. Zhuravleva, L. G. Karachkina || FLO || align=right | 4.2 km || 
|-id=422 bgcolor=#d6d6d6
| 5422 Hodgkin ||  ||  || December 23, 1982 || Nauchnij || L. G. Karachkina || — || align=right | 16 km || 
|-id=423 bgcolor=#fefefe
| 5423 Horahořejš || 1983 DC ||  || February 16, 1983 || Kleť || Z. Vávrová || — || align=right | 8.9 km || 
|-id=424 bgcolor=#fefefe
| 5424 Covington ||  ||  || October 12, 1983 || Anderson Mesa || E. Bowell || — || align=right | 4.4 km || 
|-id=425 bgcolor=#fefefe
| 5425 Vojtěch ||  ||  || September 20, 1984 || Kleť || A. Mrkos || Vmoon || align=right | 7.1 km || 
|-id=426 bgcolor=#fefefe
| 5426 Sharp || 1985 DD ||  || February 16, 1985 || Palomar || C. S. Shoemaker || Hmoon || align=right | 2.0 km || 
|-id=427 bgcolor=#fefefe
| 5427 Jensmartin || 1986 JQ ||  || May 13, 1986 || Brorfelde || P. Jensen || H || align=right | 3.2 km || 
|-id=428 bgcolor=#d6d6d6
| 5428 ||  || — || September 13, 1987 || La Silla || H. Debehogne || KOR || align=right | 9.5 km || 
|-id=429 bgcolor=#d6d6d6
| 5429 ||  || — || January 25, 1988 || Kushiro || S. Ueda, H. Kaneda || THM || align=right | 14 km || 
|-id=430 bgcolor=#fefefe
| 5430 Luu ||  ||  || May 12, 1988 || Palomar || C. S. Shoemaker, E. M. Shoemaker || PHO || align=right | 6.7 km || 
|-id=431 bgcolor=#fefefe
| 5431 Maxinehelin || 1988 MB ||  || June 19, 1988 || Palomar || E. F. Helin || — || align=right | 6.2 km || 
|-id=432 bgcolor=#E9E9E9
| 5432 Imakiire || 1988 VN ||  || November 3, 1988 || Chiyoda || T. Kojima || — || align=right | 6.0 km || 
|-id=433 bgcolor=#E9E9E9
| 5433 Kairen ||  ||  || November 10, 1988 || Chiyoda || T. Kojima || — || align=right | 8.5 km || 
|-id=434 bgcolor=#d6d6d6
| 5434 Tomwhitney || 1989 ES ||  || March 6, 1989 || Palomar || E. F. Helin || URS || align=right | 17 km || 
|-id=435 bgcolor=#d6d6d6
| 5435 Kameoka ||  ||  || January 21, 1990 || Dynic || A. Sugie || — || align=right | 26 km || 
|-id=436 bgcolor=#C2FFFF
| 5436 Eumelos || 1990 DK ||  || February 20, 1990 || Palomar || C. S. Shoemaker, E. M. Shoemaker || L4 || align=right | 38 km || 
|-id=437 bgcolor=#fefefe
| 5437 ||  || — || February 26, 1990 || La Silla || H. Debehogne || V || align=right | 6.5 km || 
|-id=438 bgcolor=#E9E9E9
| 5438 Lorre || 1990 QJ ||  || August 18, 1990 || Palomar || E. F. Helin || LOR || align=right | 28 km || 
|-id=439 bgcolor=#d6d6d6
| 5439 Couturier || 1990 RW ||  || September 14, 1990 || Palomar || H. E. Holt || 3:2 || align=right | 22 km || 
|-id=440 bgcolor=#fefefe
| 5440 Terao || 1991 HD ||  || April 16, 1991 || Dynic || A. Sugie || — || align=right | 5.5 km || 
|-id=441 bgcolor=#d6d6d6
| 5441 Andymurray ||  ||  || May 8, 1991 || Siding Spring || R. H. McNaught || EOS || align=right | 15 km || 
|-id=442 bgcolor=#d6d6d6
| 5442 Drossart ||  ||  || July 12, 1991 || Palomar || H. E. Holt || KOR || align=right | 7.4 km || 
|-id=443 bgcolor=#fefefe
| 5443 Encrenaz ||  ||  || July 14, 1991 || Palomar || H. E. Holt || — || align=right | 11 km || 
|-id=444 bgcolor=#fefefe
| 5444 Gautier ||  ||  || August 5, 1991 || Palomar || H. E. Holt || EUT || align=right | 5.0 km || 
|-id=445 bgcolor=#E9E9E9
| 5445 Williwaw ||  ||  || August 7, 1991 || Palomar || H. E. Holt || — || align=right | 8.8 km || 
|-id=446 bgcolor=#d6d6d6
| 5446 Heyler ||  ||  || August 5, 1991 || Palomar || H. E. Holt || THM || align=right | 19 km || 
|-id=447 bgcolor=#d6d6d6
| 5447 Lallement ||  ||  || August 6, 1991 || Palomar || H. E. Holt || EOS || align=right | 11 km || 
|-id=448 bgcolor=#fefefe
| 5448 Siebold || 1992 SP ||  || September 26, 1992 || Dynic || A. Sugie || — || align=right | 6.4 km || 
|-id=449 bgcolor=#d6d6d6
| 5449 ||  || — || October 28, 1992 || Kushiro || S. Ueda, H. Kaneda || EOS || align=right | 11 km || 
|-id=450 bgcolor=#E9E9E9
| 5450 Sokrates || 2780 P-L ||  || September 24, 1960 || Palomar || PLS || — || align=right | 21 km || 
|-id=451 bgcolor=#E9E9E9
| 5451 Plato || 4598 P-L ||  || September 24, 1960 || Palomar || PLS || — || align=right | 8.7 km || 
|-id=452 bgcolor=#fefefe
| 5452 || 1937 NN || — || July 5, 1937 || Johannesburg || C. Jackson || — || align=right | 6.6 km || 
|-id=453 bgcolor=#fefefe
| 5453 Zakharchenya ||  ||  || November 3, 1975 || Nauchnij || T. M. Smirnova || FLO || align=right | 4.6 km || 
|-id=454 bgcolor=#d6d6d6
| 5454 Kojiki ||  ||  || March 12, 1977 || Kiso || H. Kosai, K. Furukawa || HYG || align=right | 17 km || 
|-id=455 bgcolor=#fefefe
| 5455 Surkov ||  ||  || September 13, 1978 || Nauchnij || N. S. Chernykh || — || align=right | 4.0 km || 
|-id=456 bgcolor=#fefefe
| 5456 Merman ||  ||  || April 25, 1979 || Nauchnij || N. S. Chernykh || V || align=right | 4.2 km || 
|-id=457 bgcolor=#d6d6d6
| 5457 Queen's ||  ||  || October 9, 1980 || Palomar || C. S. Shoemaker || — || align=right | 21 km || 
|-id=458 bgcolor=#d6d6d6
| 5458 Aizman ||  ||  || October 10, 1980 || Nauchnij || N. S. Chernykh || — || align=right | 18 km || 
|-id=459 bgcolor=#d6d6d6
| 5459 Saraburger ||  ||  || August 26, 1981 || La Silla || H. Debehogne || KOR || align=right | 6.8 km || 
|-id=460 bgcolor=#fefefe
| 5460 Tsénaatʼaʼí || 1983 AW ||  || January 12, 1983 || Anderson Mesa || B. A. Skiff || — || align=right | 3.5 km || 
|-id=461 bgcolor=#d6d6d6
| 5461 Autumn ||  ||  || April 18, 1983 || Anderson Mesa || N. G. Thomas || — || align=right | 21 km || 
|-id=462 bgcolor=#fefefe
| 5462 ||  || — || September 21, 1984 || La Silla || H. Debehogne || V || align=right | 3.9 km || 
|-id=463 bgcolor=#fefefe
| 5463 Danwelcher || 1985 TO ||  || October 15, 1985 || Anderson Mesa || E. Bowell || — || align=right | 5.0 km || 
|-id=464 bgcolor=#E9E9E9
| 5464 Weller ||  ||  || November 7, 1985 || Anderson Mesa || E. Bowell || EUN || align=right | 9.7 km || 
|-id=465 bgcolor=#d6d6d6
| 5465 Chumakov ||  ||  || September 9, 1986 || Nauchnij || L. G. Karachkina || KOR || align=right | 7.7 km || 
|-id=466 bgcolor=#d6d6d6
| 5466 Makibi ||  ||  || November 30, 1986 || Kiso || H. Kosai, K. Furukawa || THM || align=right | 8.9 km || 
|-id=467 bgcolor=#E9E9E9
| 5467 || 1988 AG || — || January 11, 1988 || Okutama || T. Hioki, N. Kawasato || — || align=right | 10 km || 
|-id=468 bgcolor=#d6d6d6
| 5468 Hamatonbetsu || 1988 BK ||  || January 16, 1988 || Kagoshima || M. Mukai, M. Takeishi || — || align=right | 24 km || 
|-id=469 bgcolor=#d6d6d6
| 5469 ||  || — || January 21, 1988 || La Silla || H. Debehogne || — || align=right | 15 km || 
|-id=470 bgcolor=#d6d6d6
| 5470 Kurtlindstrom ||  ||  || January 28, 1988 || Siding Spring || R. H. McNaught || — || align=right | 14 km || 
|-id=471 bgcolor=#d6d6d6
| 5471 Tunguska ||  ||  || August 13, 1988 || Haute-Provence || E. W. Elst || EOS || align=right | 16 km || 
|-id=472 bgcolor=#fefefe
| 5472 || 1988 RR || — || September 13, 1988 || Kushiro || S. Ueda, H. Kaneda || — || align=right | 3.9 km || 
|-id=473 bgcolor=#fefefe
| 5473 Yamanashi || 1988 VR ||  || November 5, 1988 || Yatsugatake || Y. Kushida, O. Muramatsu || — || align=right | 5.2 km || 
|-id=474 bgcolor=#fefefe
| 5474 Gingasen ||  ||  || December 3, 1988 || Kitami || T. Fujii, K. Watanabe || Vmoon || align=right | 5.0 km || 
|-id=475 bgcolor=#fefefe
| 5475 Hanskennedy || 1989 QO ||  || August 26, 1989 || Siding Spring || R. H. McNaught || H || align=right | 2.1 km || 
|-id=476 bgcolor=#C2FFFF
| 5476 Mulius ||  ||  || October 2, 1989 || Cerro Tololo || S. J. Bus || L5 || align=right | 35 km || 
|-id=477 bgcolor=#fefefe
| 5477 Holmes ||  ||  || October 27, 1989 || Palomar || E. F. Helin || Hmoon || align=right | 3.1 km || 
|-id=478 bgcolor=#E9E9E9
| 5478 Wartburg ||  ||  || October 23, 1989 || Tautenburg Observatory || F. Börngen || — || align=right | 8.2 km || 
|-id=479 bgcolor=#E9E9E9
| 5479 Grahamryder ||  ||  || October 30, 1989 || Cerro Tololo || S. J. Bus || — || align=right | 5.8 km || 
|-id=480 bgcolor=#d6d6d6
| 5480 ||  || — || December 23, 1989 || Kushiro || S. Ueda, H. Kaneda || — || align=right | 15 km || 
|-id=481 bgcolor=#fefefe
| 5481 Kiuchi || 1990 CH ||  || February 15, 1990 || Kitami || K. Endate, K. Watanabe || Vmoon || align=right | 4.6 km || 
|-id=482 bgcolor=#E9E9E9
| 5482 Korankei || 1990 DX ||  || February 27, 1990 || Toyota || K. Suzuki, T. Urata || — || align=right | 5.7 km || 
|-id=483 bgcolor=#d6d6d6
| 5483 Cherkashin ||  ||  || October 17, 1990 || Nauchnij || L. I. Chernykh || — || align=right | 17 km || 
|-id=484 bgcolor=#fefefe
| 5484 Inoda ||  ||  || November 7, 1990 || Oohira || T. Urata || — || align=right | 10 km || 
|-id=485 bgcolor=#E9E9E9
| 5485 Kaula ||  ||  || September 11, 1991 || Palomar || H. E. Holt || — || align=right | 13 km || 
|-id=486 bgcolor=#E9E9E9
| 5486 ||  || — || October 31, 1991 || Kushiro || S. Ueda, H. Kaneda || — || align=right | 7.2 km || 
|-id=487 bgcolor=#fefefe
| 5487 ||  || — || October 18, 1991 || Kushiro || S. Ueda, H. Kaneda || NYS || align=right | 4.1 km || 
|-id=488 bgcolor=#d6d6d6
| 5488 Kiyosato ||  ||  || November 13, 1991 || Kiyosato || S. Otomo || EOS || align=right | 19 km || 
|-id=489 bgcolor=#E9E9E9
| 5489 Oberkochen ||  ||  || January 17, 1993 || Yatsugatake || Y. Kushida, O. Muramatsu || EUN || align=right | 13 km || 
|-id=490 bgcolor=#fefefe
| 5490 Burbidge || 2019 P-L ||  || September 24, 1960 || Palomar || PLS || — || align=right | 3.6 km || 
|-id=491 bgcolor=#fefefe
| 5491 Kaulbach || 3128 T-1 ||  || March 26, 1971 || Palomar || PLS || FLO || align=right | 4.3 km || 
|-id=492 bgcolor=#E9E9E9
| 5492 Thoma || 3227 T-1 ||  || March 26, 1971 || Palomar || PLS || WAT || align=right | 13 km || 
|-id=493 bgcolor=#fefefe
| 5493 Spitzweg || 1617 T-2 ||  || September 24, 1973 || Palomar || PLS || — || align=right | 5.5 km || 
|-id=494 bgcolor=#d6d6d6
| 5494 Johanmohr ||  ||  || October 19, 1933 || Heidelberg || K. Reinmuth || KOR || align=right | 8.9 km || 
|-id=495 bgcolor=#d6d6d6
| 5495 Rumyantsev ||  ||  || September 6, 1972 || Nauchnij || L. V. Zhuravleva || 7:4 || align=right | 26 km || 
|-id=496 bgcolor=#FFC2E0
| 5496 || 1973 NA || — || July 4, 1973 || Palomar || E. F. Helin || APO +1km || align=right | 2.3 km || 
|-id=497 bgcolor=#d6d6d6
| 5497 Sararussell || 1975 SS ||  || September 30, 1975 || Palomar || S. J. Bus || EOS || align=right | 11 km || 
|-id=498 bgcolor=#fefefe
| 5498 Gustafsson ||  ||  || March 16, 1980 || La Silla || C.-I. Lagerkvist || — || align=right | 3.5 km || 
|-id=499 bgcolor=#fefefe
| 5499 ||  || — || September 29, 1981 || Haute-Provence || Haute-Provence Obs. || — || align=right | 3.8 km || 
|-id=500 bgcolor=#fefefe
| 5500 Twilley || 1981 WR ||  || November 24, 1981 || Anderson Mesa || E. Bowell || FLOmoon || align=right | 4.5 km || 
|}

5501–5600 

|-bgcolor=#fefefe
| 5501 ||  || — || March 30, 1982 || Socorro || L. G. Taff || — || align=right | 5.4 km || 
|-id=502 bgcolor=#E9E9E9
| 5502 Brashear || 1984 EC ||  || March 1, 1984 || Anderson Mesa || E. Bowell || EUN || align=right | 6.5 km || 
|-id=503 bgcolor=#E9E9E9
| 5503 ||  || — || February 13, 1985 || La Silla || H. Debehogne || — || align=right | 7.4 km || 
|-id=504 bgcolor=#E9E9E9
| 5504 Lanzerotti ||  ||  || March 22, 1985 || Anderson Mesa || E. Bowell || — || align=right | 7.2 km || 
|-id=505 bgcolor=#d6d6d6
| 5505 Rundetaarn ||  ||  || November 6, 1986 || Brorfelde || P. Jensen || — || align=right | 22 km || 
|-id=506 bgcolor=#fefefe
| 5506 Artiglio ||  ||  || September 24, 1987 || La Silla || H. Debehogne || ERI || align=right | 11 km || 
|-id=507 bgcolor=#E9E9E9
| 5507 Niijima || 1987 UJ ||  || October 21, 1987 || Toyota || K. Suzuki, T. Urata || — || align=right | 5.5 km || 
|-id=508 bgcolor=#d6d6d6
| 5508 Gomyou || 1988 EB ||  || March 9, 1988 || Oohira || Oohira Stn. || — || align=right | 15 km || 
|-id=509 bgcolor=#fefefe
| 5509 Rennsteig ||  ||  || September 8, 1988 || Tautenburg Observatory || F. Börngen || — || align=right | 3.1 km || 
|-id=510 bgcolor=#FA8072
| 5510 ||  || — || September 2, 1988 || La Silla || H. Debehogne || — || align=right | 4.3 km || 
|-id=511 bgcolor=#C2FFFF
| 5511 Cloanthus ||  ||  || October 8, 1988 || Palomar || C. S. Shoemaker, E. M. Shoemaker || L5slow? || align=right | 40 km || 
|-id=512 bgcolor=#fefefe
| 5512 ||  || — || November 10, 1988 || Okutama || T. Hioki, N. Kawasato || FLO || align=right | 5.3 km || 
|-id=513 bgcolor=#fefefe
| 5513 Yukio || 1988 WB ||  || November 27, 1988 || Oohira || W. Kakei, M. Kizawa, T. Urata || — || align=right | 5.3 km || 
|-id=514 bgcolor=#E9E9E9
| 5514 Karelraška ||  ||  || January 29, 1989 || Kleť || Z. Vávrová || — || align=right | 5.2 km || 
|-id=515 bgcolor=#E9E9E9
| 5515 Naderi ||  ||  || March 5, 1989 || Palomar || E. F. Helin || — || align=right | 7.0 km || 
|-id=516 bgcolor=#E9E9E9
| 5516 Jawilliamson || 1989 JK ||  || May 2, 1989 || Palomar || E. F. Helin || MIT || align=right | 12 km || 
|-id=517 bgcolor=#E9E9E9
| 5517 Johnerogers || 1989 LJ ||  || June 4, 1989 || Palomar || E. F. Helin || EUN || align=right | 6.0 km || 
|-id=518 bgcolor=#fefefe
| 5518 Mariobotta || 1989 YF ||  || December 30, 1989 || Chions || J. M. Baur || slow || align=right | 7.2 km || 
|-id=519 bgcolor=#d6d6d6
| 5519 Lellouch ||  ||  || August 23, 1990 || Palomar || H. E. Holt || — || align=right | 20 km || 
|-id=520 bgcolor=#d6d6d6
| 5520 Natori || 1990 RB ||  || September 12, 1990 || Oohira || T. Urata || EOS || align=right | 12 km || 
|-id=521 bgcolor=#E9E9E9
| 5521 Morpurgo ||  ||  || August 15, 1991 || Palomar || E. F. Helin || — || align=right | 10 km || 
|-id=522 bgcolor=#fefefe
| 5522 De Rop ||  ||  || August 3, 1991 || La Silla || E. W. Elst || NYS || align=right | 5.4 km || 
|-id=523 bgcolor=#d6d6d6
| 5523 Luminet ||  ||  || August 5, 1991 || Palomar || H. E. Holt || KOR || align=right | 8.1 km || 
|-id=524 bgcolor=#fefefe
| 5524 Lecacheux ||  ||  || September 15, 1991 || Palomar || H. E. Holt || — || align=right | 20 km || 
|-id=525 bgcolor=#fefefe
| 5525 ||  || — || October 15, 1991 || Uenohara || N. Kawasato || — || align=right | 5.3 km || 
|-id=526 bgcolor=#E9E9E9
| 5526 Kenzo ||  ||  || October 18, 1991 || Oohira || T. Urata || — || align=right | 7.4 km || 
|-id=527 bgcolor=#fefefe
| 5527 ||  || — || October 31, 1991 || Kushiro || S. Ueda, H. Kaneda || — || align=right | 4.9 km || 
|-id=528 bgcolor=#d6d6d6
| 5528 || 1992 AJ || — || January 2, 1992 || Kushiro || S. Ueda, H. Kaneda || — || align=right | 21 km || 
|-id=529 bgcolor=#fefefe
| 5529 Perry || 2557 P-L ||  || September 24, 1960 || Palomar || PLS || — || align=right | 3.6 km || 
|-id=530 bgcolor=#fefefe
| 5530 Eisinga || 2835 P-L ||  || September 24, 1960 || Palomar || PLS || — || align=right | 4.7 km || 
|-id=531 bgcolor=#E9E9E9
| 5531 Carolientje || 1051 T-2 ||  || September 29, 1973 || Palomar || PLS || — || align=right | 12 km || 
|-id=532 bgcolor=#d6d6d6
| 5532 Ichinohe || 1932 CY ||  || February 14, 1932 || Heidelberg || K. Reinmuth || — || align=right | 18 km || 
|-id=533 bgcolor=#fefefe
| 5533 Bagrov || 1935 SC ||  || September 21, 1935 || Crimea–Simeis || P. F. Shajn || FLO || align=right | 4.5 km || 
|-id=534 bgcolor=#E9E9E9
| 5534 || 1941 UN || — || October 15, 1941 || Turku || L. Oterma || — || align=right | 8.5 km || 
|-id=535 bgcolor=#fefefe
| 5535 Annefrank || 1942 EM ||  || March 23, 1942 || Heidelberg || K. Reinmuth || FLO || align=right | 4.8 km || 
|-id=536 bgcolor=#fefefe
| 5536 Honeycutt || 1955 QN ||  || August 23, 1955 || Brooklyn || Indiana University || moon || align=right | 7.6 km || 
|-id=537 bgcolor=#fefefe
| 5537 Sanya ||  ||  || October 9, 1964 || Nanking || Purple Mountain Obs. || — || align=right | 3.9 km || 
|-id=538 bgcolor=#fefefe
| 5538 Luichewoo ||  ||  || October 9, 1964 || Nanking || Purple Mountain Obs. || FLO || align=right | 2.9 km || 
|-id=539 bgcolor=#fefefe
| 5539 Limporyen ||  ||  || October 16, 1965 || Nanking || Purple Mountain Obs. || NYS || align=right | 10 km || 
|-id=540 bgcolor=#E9E9E9
| 5540 Smirnova ||  ||  || August 30, 1971 || Nauchnij || T. M. Smirnova || — || align=right | 3.6 km || 
|-id=541 bgcolor=#d6d6d6
| 5541 Seimei ||  ||  || October 22, 1976 || Kiso || H. Kosai, K. Furukawa || — || align=right | 13 km || 
|-id=542 bgcolor=#E9E9E9
| 5542 Moffatt ||  ||  || August 6, 1978 || Bickley || Perth Obs. || MAR || align=right | 8.6 km || 
|-id=543 bgcolor=#fefefe
| 5543 Sharaf ||  ||  || October 3, 1978 || Nauchnij || N. S. Chernykh || — || align=right | 4.4 km || 
|-id=544 bgcolor=#E9E9E9
| 5544 Kazakov ||  ||  || October 2, 1978 || Nauchnij || L. V. Zhuravleva || — || align=right | 9.3 km || 
|-id=545 bgcolor=#E9E9E9
| 5545 Makarov ||  ||  || November 1, 1978 || Nauchnij || L. V. Zhuravleva || HEN || align=right | 6.1 km || 
|-id=546 bgcolor=#E9E9E9
| 5546 Salavat || 1979 YS ||  || December 18, 1979 || La Silla || H. Debehogne || EUN || align=right | 8.4 km || 
|-id=547 bgcolor=#E9E9E9
| 5547 Acadiau ||  ||  || June 11, 1980 || Palomar || C. S. Shoemaker || EUN || align=right | 9.2 km || 
|-id=548 bgcolor=#d6d6d6
| 5548 Thosharriot || 1980 TH ||  || October 3, 1980 || Kleť || Z. Vávrová || EOS || align=right | 12 km || 
|-id=549 bgcolor=#E9E9E9
| 5549 Bobstefanik ||  ||  || April 1, 1981 || Harvard Observatory || Harvard Obs. || EUN || align=right | 6.4 km || 
|-id=550 bgcolor=#d6d6d6
| 5550 ||  || — || October 30, 1981 || Socorro || L. G. Taff || THM || align=right | 18 km || 
|-id=551 bgcolor=#fefefe
| 5551 Glikson || 1982 BJ ||  || January 24, 1982 || Palomar || C. S. Shoemaker, E. M. Shoemaker || PHO || align=right | 5.6 km || 
|-id=552 bgcolor=#E9E9E9
| 5552 Studnička ||  ||  || September 16, 1982 || Kleť || A. Mrkos || — || align=right | 7.3 km || 
|-id=553 bgcolor=#E9E9E9
| 5553 Chodas ||  ||  || February 6, 1984 || Anderson Mesa || E. Bowell || CLO || align=right | 10 km || 
|-id=554 bgcolor=#fefefe
| 5554 Keesey ||  ||  || October 15, 1985 || Anderson Mesa || E. Bowell || — || align=right | 4.2 km || 
|-id=555 bgcolor=#d6d6d6
| 5555 Wimberly ||  ||  || November 5, 1986 || Anderson Mesa || E. Bowell || EOS || align=right | 11 km || 
|-id=556 bgcolor=#E9E9E9
| 5556 || 1988 AL || — || January 15, 1988 || Kushiro || S. Ueda, H. Kaneda || — || align=right | 13 km || 
|-id=557 bgcolor=#E9E9E9
| 5557 Chimikeppuko ||  ||  || February 7, 1989 || Kitami || K. Endate, K. Watanabe || — || align=right | 7.1 km || 
|-id=558 bgcolor=#fefefe
| 5558 Johnnapier ||  ||  || November 24, 1989 || Siding Spring || R. H. McNaught || H || align=right | 2.3 km || 
|-id=559 bgcolor=#fefefe
| 5559 Beategordon || 1990 MV ||  || June 27, 1990 || Palomar || E. F. Helin || — || align=right | 7.6 km || 
|-id=560 bgcolor=#fefefe
| 5560 Amytis || 1990 MX ||  || June 27, 1990 || Palomar || E. F. Helin || FLO || align=right | 4.7 km || 
|-id=561 bgcolor=#fefefe
| 5561 Iguchi || 1991 QD ||  || August 17, 1991 || Kiyosato || S. Otomo || slow || align=right | 6.9 km || 
|-id=562 bgcolor=#fefefe
| 5562 Sumi || 1991 VS ||  || November 4, 1991 || Kushiro || S. Ueda, H. Kaneda || — || align=right | 4.5 km || 
|-id=563 bgcolor=#E9E9E9
| 5563 Yuuri ||  ||  || November 9, 1991 || Kushiro || S. Ueda, H. Kaneda || — || align=right | 10 km || 
|-id=564 bgcolor=#E9E9E9
| 5564 Hikari ||  ||  || November 9, 1991 || Kushiro || S. Ueda, H. Kaneda || — || align=right | 6.2 km || 
|-id=565 bgcolor=#E9E9E9
| 5565 Ukyounodaibu ||  ||  || November 10, 1991 || Yakiimo || A. Natori, T. Urata || — || align=right | 12 km || 
|-id=566 bgcolor=#d6d6d6
| 5566 ||  || — || November 11, 1991 || Kushiro || S. Ueda, H. Kaneda || THM || align=right | 14 km || 
|-id=567 bgcolor=#d6d6d6
| 5567 Durisen ||  ||  || March 21, 1953 || Brooklyn || Indiana University || DUR || align=right | 36 km || 
|-id=568 bgcolor=#fefefe
| 5568 Mufson ||  ||  || October 14, 1953 || Brooklyn || Indiana University || — || align=right | 5.2 km || 
|-id=569 bgcolor=#fefefe
| 5569 Colby || 1974 FO ||  || March 22, 1974 || Cerro El Roble || C. Torres || — || align=right | 6.1 km || 
|-id=570 bgcolor=#d6d6d6
| 5570 Kirsan ||  ||  || April 4, 1976 || Nauchnij || N. S. Chernykh || — || align=right | 15 km || 
|-id=571 bgcolor=#d6d6d6
| 5571 Lesliegreen || 1978 LG ||  || June 1, 1978 || La Silla || K. W. Kamper || EOS || align=right | 14 km || 
|-id=572 bgcolor=#d6d6d6
| 5572 Bliskunov ||  ||  || September 26, 1978 || Nauchnij || L. V. Zhuravleva || — || align=right | 20 km || 
|-id=573 bgcolor=#E9E9E9
| 5573 Hilarydownes || 1981 QX ||  || August 24, 1981 || Kleť || A. Mrkos || — || align=right | 10 km || 
|-id=574 bgcolor=#E9E9E9
| 5574 Seagrave || 1984 FS ||  || March 20, 1984 || Kleť || Z. Vávrová || EUN || align=right | 8.9 km || 
|-id=575 bgcolor=#d6d6d6
| 5575 Ryanpark ||  ||  || September 4, 1985 || La Silla || H. Debehogne || THM || align=right | 13 km || 
|-id=576 bgcolor=#E9E9E9
| 5576 Albanese ||  ||  || October 26, 1986 || Caussols || CERGA || — || align=right | 24 km || 
|-id=577 bgcolor=#fefefe
| 5577 Priestley ||  ||  || November 21, 1986 || Siding Spring || J. D. Waldron || Hslow || align=right | 4.0 km || 
|-id=578 bgcolor=#d6d6d6
| 5578 Takakura || 1987 BC ||  || January 28, 1987 || Ojima || T. Niijima, T. Urata || KOR || align=right | 8.1 km || 
|-id=579 bgcolor=#fefefe
| 5579 Uhlherr || 1988 JL ||  || May 11, 1988 || Palomar || C. S. Shoemaker, E. M. Shoemaker || H || align=right | 2.7 km || 
|-id=580 bgcolor=#fefefe
| 5580 Sharidake ||  ||  || September 10, 1988 || Kitami || K. Endate, K. Watanabe || FLO || align=right | 3.8 km || 
|-id=581 bgcolor=#fefefe
| 5581 Mitsuko ||  ||  || February 10, 1989 || Tokushima || M. Iwamoto, T. Furuta || NYS || align=right | 3.8 km || 
|-id=582 bgcolor=#d6d6d6
| 5582 ||  || — || February 13, 1989 || La Silla || H. Debehogne || KOR || align=right | 7.6 km || 
|-id=583 bgcolor=#d6d6d6
| 5583 Braunerová ||  ||  || March 5, 1989 || Kleť || A. Mrkos || KOR || align=right | 8.2 km || 
|-id=584 bgcolor=#E9E9E9
| 5584 Izenberg || 1989 KK ||  || May 31, 1989 || Palomar || H. E. Holt || EUN || align=right | 6.7 km || 
|-id=585 bgcolor=#FA8072
| 5585 Parks || 1990 MJ ||  || June 28, 1990 || Palomar || E. F. Helin || — || align=right | 8.4 km || 
|-id=586 bgcolor=#fefefe
| 5586 ||  || — || September 9, 1990 || La Silla || H. Debehogne || — || align=right | 7.2 km || 
|-id=587 bgcolor=#FFC2E0
| 5587 || 1990 SB || — || September 16, 1990 || Palomar || H. E. Holt, J. A. Brown || AMO +1km || align=right | 3.6 km || 
|-id=588 bgcolor=#E9E9E9
| 5588 Jennabelle ||  ||  || September 23, 1990 || Palomar || B. Roman || — || align=right | 11 km || 
|-id=589 bgcolor=#E9E9E9
| 5589 De Meis ||  ||  || September 23, 1990 || La Silla || H. Debehogne || HEN || align=right | 7.4 km || 
|-id=590 bgcolor=#FFC2E0
| 5590 || 1990 VA || — || November 9, 1990 || Kitt Peak || Spacewatch || ATEcritical || align=right data-sort-value="0.41" | 410 m || 
|-id=591 bgcolor=#E9E9E9
| 5591 Koyo ||  ||  || November 10, 1990 || Oohira || T. Urata || HOF || align=right | 17 km || 
|-id=592 bgcolor=#d6d6d6
| 5592 Oshima ||  ||  || November 14, 1990 || Toyota || K. Suzuki, T. Urata || VER || align=right | 23 km || 
|-id=593 bgcolor=#fefefe
| 5593 Jonsujatha ||  ||  || May 9, 1991 || Palomar || E. F. Helin || FLO || align=right | 7.3 km || 
|-id=594 bgcolor=#d6d6d6
| 5594 Jimmiller ||  ||  || July 12, 1991 || Palomar || H. E. Holt || VER || align=right | 26 km || 
|-id=595 bgcolor=#E9E9E9
| 5595 Roth || 1991 PJ ||  || August 5, 1991 || Palomar || H. E. Holt || — || align=right | 9.8 km || 
|-id=596 bgcolor=#fefefe
| 5596 Morbidelli ||  ||  || August 7, 1991 || Palomar || H. E. Holt || FLO || align=right | 5.7 km || 
|-id=597 bgcolor=#fefefe
| 5597 Warren ||  ||  || August 5, 1991 || Palomar || H. E. Holt || — || align=right | 4.0 km || 
|-id=598 bgcolor=#fefefe
| 5598 Carlmurray ||  ||  || August 8, 1991 || Palomar || H. E. Holt || — || align=right | 6.9 km || 
|-id=599 bgcolor=#fefefe
| 5599 ||  || — || September 29, 1991 || Kushiro || S. Ueda, H. Kaneda || — || align=right | 6.4 km || 
|-id=600 bgcolor=#fefefe
| 5600 || 1991 UY || — || October 18, 1991 || Kushiro || S. Ueda, H. Kaneda || V || align=right | 5.9 km || 
|}

5601–5700 

|-bgcolor=#fefefe
| 5601 || 1991 VR || — || November 4, 1991 || Kushiro || S. Ueda, H. Kaneda || — || align=right | 4.5 km || 
|-id=602 bgcolor=#fefefe
| 5602 ||  || — || November 4, 1991 || Kushiro || S. Ueda, H. Kaneda || — || align=right | 3.8 km || 
|-id=603 bgcolor=#d6d6d6
| 5603 Rausudake || 1992 CE ||  || February 5, 1992 || Kitami || K. Endate, K. Watanabe || 3:2 || align=right | 46 km || 
|-id=604 bgcolor=#FFC2E0
| 5604 || 1992 FE || — || March 26, 1992 || Siding Spring || R. H. McNaught || ATE +1kmPHA || align=right data-sort-value="0.55" | 550 m || 
|-id=605 bgcolor=#fefefe
| 5605 Kushida || 1993 DB ||  || February 17, 1993 || Kiyosato || S. Otomo || — || align=right | 5.2 km || 
|-id=606 bgcolor=#fefefe
| 5606 Muramatsu || 1993 EH ||  || March 1, 1993 || Kiyosato || S. Otomo || — || align=right | 4.8 km || 
|-id=607 bgcolor=#E9E9E9
| 5607 || 1993 EN || — || March 12, 1993 || Kushiro || S. Ueda, H. Kaneda || — || align=right | 9.1 km || 
|-id=608 bgcolor=#E9E9E9
| 5608 Olmos || 1993 EO ||  || March 12, 1993 || Kushiro || S. Ueda, H. Kaneda || HEN || align=right | 6.7 km || 
|-id=609 bgcolor=#d6d6d6
| 5609 Stroncone || 1993 FU ||  || March 22, 1993 || Stroncone || A. Vagnozzi || THM || align=right | 14 km || 
|-id=610 bgcolor=#E9E9E9
| 5610 Balster || 2041 T-3 ||  || October 16, 1977 || Palomar || PLS || — || align=right | 7.8 km || 
|-id=611 bgcolor=#E9E9E9
| 5611 || 1943 DL || — || February 26, 1943 || Turku || L. Oterma || EUN || align=right | 9.4 km || 
|-id=612 bgcolor=#fefefe
| 5612 Nevskij ||  ||  || October 3, 1975 || Nauchnij || L. I. Chernykh || — || align=right | 5.2 km || 
|-id=613 bgcolor=#d6d6d6
| 5613 Donskoj ||  ||  || December 16, 1976 || Nauchnij || L. I. Chernykh || THM || align=right | 14 km || 
|-id=614 bgcolor=#d6d6d6
| 5614 Yakovlev || 1979 VN ||  || November 11, 1979 || Nauchnij || N. S. Chernykh || YAK || align=right | 13 km || 
|-id=615 bgcolor=#fefefe
| 5615 Iskander || 1983 PZ ||  || August 4, 1983 || Nauchnij || L. G. Karachkina || FLO || align=right | 5.5 km || 
|-id=616 bgcolor=#E9E9E9
| 5616 Vogtland ||  ||  || September 29, 1987 || Tautenburg Observatory || F. Börngen || — || align=right | 10 km || 
|-id=617 bgcolor=#fefefe
| 5617 Emelyanenko || 1989 EL ||  || March 5, 1989 || Palomar || E. F. Helin || — || align=right | 4.7 km || 
|-id=618 bgcolor=#fefefe
| 5618 Saitama || 1990 EA ||  || March 4, 1990 || Dynic || A. Sugie || — || align=right | 3.7 km || 
|-id=619 bgcolor=#E9E9E9
| 5619 Shair ||  ||  || April 26, 1990 || Palomar || E. F. Helin || — || align=right | 12 km || 
|-id=620 bgcolor=#FFC2E0
| 5620 Jasonwheeler || 1990 OA ||  || July 19, 1990 || Palomar || B. Roman, E. F. Helin || AMO +1km || align=right | 1.4 km || 
|-id=621 bgcolor=#FA8072
| 5621 Erb ||  ||  || September 23, 1990 || Palomar || K. J. Lawrence || — || align=right | 3.3 km || 
|-id=622 bgcolor=#E9E9E9
| 5622 Percyjulian ||  ||  || October 14, 1990 || Palomar || E. F. Helin || GEF || align=right | 9.7 km || 
|-id=623 bgcolor=#d6d6d6
| 5623 Iwamori || 1990 UY ||  || October 20, 1990 || Dynic || A. Sugie || EOS || align=right | 14 km || 
|-id=624 bgcolor=#d6d6d6
| 5624 Shirley ||  ||  || January 11, 1991 || Palomar || E. F. Helin || — || align=right | 19 km || 
|-id=625 bgcolor=#E9E9E9
| 5625 Jamesferguson ||  ||  || January 7, 1991 || Siding Spring || R. H. McNaught || ADE || align=right | 15 km || 
|-id=626 bgcolor=#FFC2E0
| 5626 Melissabrucker || 1991 FE ||  || March 18, 1991 || Kitt Peak || Spacewatch || AMO +1kmslow || align=right | 5.0 km || 
|-id=627 bgcolor=#fefefe
| 5627 Short || 1991 MA ||  || June 16, 1991 || Siding Spring || R. H. McNaught || H || align=right | 2.7 km || 
|-id=628 bgcolor=#E9E9E9
| 5628 Preussen ||  ||  || September 13, 1991 || Tautenburg Observatory || L. D. Schmadel, F. Börngen || — || align=right | 12 km || 
|-id=629 bgcolor=#d6d6d6
| 5629 Kuwana ||  ||  || February 20, 1993 || Okutama || T. Hioki, S. Hayakawa || EOS || align=right | 14 km || 
|-id=630 bgcolor=#fefefe
| 5630 Billschaefer || 1993 FZ ||  || March 21, 1993 || Palomar || J. B. Child || — || align=right | 4.8 km || 
|-id=631 bgcolor=#fefefe
| 5631 Sekihokutouge ||  ||  || March 20, 1993 || Kitami || K. Endate, K. Watanabe || — || align=right | 4.5 km || 
|-id=632 bgcolor=#E9E9E9
| 5632 Ingelehmann || 1993 GG ||  || April 15, 1993 || Palomar || C. S. Shoemaker, E. M. Shoemaker || — || align=right | 13 km || 
|-id=633 bgcolor=#fefefe
| 5633 ||  || — || October 27, 1978 || Palomar || C. M. Olmstead || — || align=right | 4.5 km || 
|-id=634 bgcolor=#fefefe
| 5634 Victorborge ||  ||  || November 7, 1978 || Palomar || E. F. Helin, S. J. Bus || — || align=right | 3.5 km || 
|-id=635 bgcolor=#fefefe
| 5635 Cole ||  ||  || March 2, 1981 || Siding Spring || S. J. Bus || — || align=right | 3.5 km || 
|-id=636 bgcolor=#E9E9E9
| 5636 Jacobson || 1985 QN ||  || August 22, 1985 || Anderson Mesa || E. Bowell || — || align=right | 7.8 km || 
|-id=637 bgcolor=#C2FFFF
| 5637 Gyas ||  ||  || September 10, 1988 || Palomar || C. S. Shoemaker, E. M. Shoemaker || L5 || align=right | 28 km || 
|-id=638 bgcolor=#C2FFFF
| 5638 Deikoon ||  ||  || October 10, 1988 || Palomar || C. S. Shoemaker, E. M. Shoemaker || L5 || align=right | 41 km || 
|-id=639 bgcolor=#fefefe
| 5639 Ćuk || 1989 PE ||  || August 9, 1989 || Palomar || J. Alu, E. F. Helin || H || align=right | 3.4 km || 
|-id=640 bgcolor=#E9E9E9
| 5640 Yoshino ||  ||  || October 21, 1989 || Kagoshima || M. Mukai, M. Takeishi || — || align=right | 5.8 km || 
|-id=641 bgcolor=#FA8072
| 5641 McCleese || 1990 DJ ||  || February 27, 1990 || Palomar || E. F. Helin || Hslow || align=right | 5.7 km || 
|-id=642 bgcolor=#FA8072
| 5642 Bobbywilliams ||  ||  || July 27, 1990 || Palomar || H. E. Holt || — || align=right | 3.2 km || 
|-id=643 bgcolor=#fefefe
| 5643 Roques ||  ||  || August 22, 1990 || Palomar || H. E. Holt || FLO || align=right | 3.0 km || 
|-id=644 bgcolor=#d6d6d6
| 5644 Maureenbell ||  ||  || August 22, 1990 || Palomar || H. E. Holt || — || align=right | 16 km || 
|-id=645 bgcolor=#FFC2E0
| 5645 || 1990 SP || — || September 20, 1990 || Siding Spring || R. H. McNaught || APO +1km || align=right | 1.7 km || 
|-id=646 bgcolor=#FFC2E0
| 5646 || 1990 TR || — || October 11, 1990 || Kushiro || S. Ueda, H. Kaneda || AMO +1kmmoon || align=right | 4.3 km || 
|-id=647 bgcolor=#fefefe
| 5647 Sarojininaidu || 1990 TZ ||  || October 14, 1990 || Palomar || E. F. Helin || PHO || align=right | 8.6 km || 
|-id=648 bgcolor=#C2FFFF
| 5648 Axius ||  ||  || November 11, 1990 || Kitami || K. Endate, K. Watanabe || L5 || align=right | 59 km || 
|-id=649 bgcolor=#FA8072
| 5649 Donnashirley ||  ||  || November 18, 1990 || Palomar || E. F. Helin || — || align=right | 2.6 km || 
|-id=650 bgcolor=#E9E9E9
| 5650 Mochihito-o || 1990 XK ||  || December 10, 1990 || Yakiimo || A. Natori, T. Urata || EUN || align=right | 11 km || 
|-id=651 bgcolor=#d6d6d6
| 5651 Traversa ||  ||  || February 14, 1991 || Haute-Provence || E. W. Elst || — || align=right | 27 km || 
|-id=652 bgcolor=#C2FFFF
| 5652 Amphimachus ||  ||  || April 24, 1992 || Palomar || C. S. Shoemaker, E. M. Shoemaker || L4 || align=right | 54 km || 
|-id=653 bgcolor=#FFC2E0
| 5653 Camarillo ||  ||  || November 21, 1992 || Palomar || E. F. Helin, K. J. Lawrence || AMO +1km || align=right | 1.5 km || 
|-id=654 bgcolor=#E9E9E9
| 5654 Terni || 1993 KG ||  || May 20, 1993 || Stroncone || A. Vagnozzi || — || align=right | 19 km || 
|-id=655 bgcolor=#E9E9E9
| 5655 Barney || 1159 T-2 ||  || September 29, 1973 || Palomar || PLS || MAR || align=right | 6.6 km || 
|-id=656 bgcolor=#fefefe
| 5656 Oldfield || A920 TA ||  || October 8, 1920 || Hamburg-Bergedorf || W. Baade || — || align=right | 7.7 km || 
|-id=657 bgcolor=#E9E9E9
| 5657 Groombridge ||  ||  || August 28, 1936 || Heidelberg || K. Reinmuth || EUN || align=right | 7.4 km || 
|-id=658 bgcolor=#E9E9E9
| 5658 Clausbaader || 1950 DO ||  || February 17, 1950 || Heidelberg || K. Reinmuth || — || align=right | 12 km || 
|-id=659 bgcolor=#fefefe
| 5659 Vergara ||  ||  || July 18, 1968 || Cerro El Roble || C. Torres, S. Cofré || V || align=right | 2.2 km || 
|-id=660 bgcolor=#FFC2E0
| 5660 || 1974 MA || — || June 26, 1974 || Palomar || C. T. Kowal || APO +1km || align=right | 2.8 km || 
|-id=661 bgcolor=#d6d6d6
| 5661 Hildebrand ||  ||  || August 14, 1977 || Nauchnij || N. S. Chernykh || 3:2 || align=right | 34 km || 
|-id=662 bgcolor=#d6d6d6
| 5662 Wendycalvin ||  ||  || March 2, 1981 || Siding Spring || S. J. Bus || EOS || align=right | 9.3 km || 
|-id=663 bgcolor=#fefefe
| 5663 McKeegan ||  ||  || March 1, 1981 || Siding Spring || S. J. Bus || — || align=right | 5.5 km || 
|-id=664 bgcolor=#fefefe
| 5664 Eugster ||  ||  || March 6, 1981 || Siding Spring || S. J. Bus || V || align=right | 2.6 km || 
|-id=665 bgcolor=#fefefe
| 5665 Begemann ||  ||  || January 30, 1982 || Palomar || S. J. Bus || FLO || align=right | 3.6 km || 
|-id=666 bgcolor=#fefefe
| 5666 Rabelais ||  ||  || October 14, 1982 || Nauchnij || L. G. Karachkina || — || align=right | 12 km || 
|-id=667 bgcolor=#fefefe
| 5667 Nakhimovskaya ||  ||  || August 16, 1983 || Nauchnij || T. M. Smirnova || FLO || align=right | 4.7 km || 
|-id=668 bgcolor=#fefefe
| 5668 Foucault || 1984 FU ||  || March 22, 1984 || Kleť || A. Mrkos || FLO || align=right | 5.1 km || 
|-id=669 bgcolor=#fefefe
| 5669 ||  || — || February 12, 1985 || La Silla || H. Debehogne || — || align=right | 6.1 km || 
|-id=670 bgcolor=#d6d6d6
| 5670 Rosstaylor ||  ||  || November 7, 1985 || Palomar || C. S. Shoemaker, E. M. Shoemaker || — || align=right | 30 km || 
|-id=671 bgcolor=#E9E9E9
| 5671 Chanal || 1985 XR ||  || December 13, 1985 || Caussols || CERGA || HEN || align=right | 8.2 km || 
|-id=672 bgcolor=#fefefe
| 5672 Libby ||  ||  || March 6, 1986 || Anderson Mesa || E. Bowell || slow || align=right | 6.6 km || 
|-id=673 bgcolor=#fefefe
| 5673 McAllister ||  ||  || September 6, 1986 || Anderson Mesa || E. Bowell || — || align=right | 5.3 km || 
|-id=674 bgcolor=#fefefe
| 5674 Wolff ||  ||  || September 6, 1986 || Anderson Mesa || E. Bowell || moon || align=right | 6.0 km || 
|-id=675 bgcolor=#fefefe
| 5675 Evgenilebedev ||  ||  || September 7, 1986 || Nauchnij || L. I. Chernykh || V || align=right | 4.1 km || 
|-id=676 bgcolor=#fefefe
| 5676 Voltaire ||  ||  || September 9, 1986 || Nauchnij || L. G. Karachkina || — || align=right | 10 km || 
|-id=677 bgcolor=#d6d6d6
| 5677 Aberdonia ||  ||  || September 21, 1987 || Anderson Mesa || E. Bowell || KOR || align=right | 8.8 km || 
|-id=678 bgcolor=#E9E9E9
| 5678 DuBridge || 1989 TS ||  || October 1, 1989 || Palomar || E. F. Helin || PAL || align=right | 5.9 km || 
|-id=679 bgcolor=#d6d6d6
| 5679 Akkado || 1989 VR ||  || November 2, 1989 || Kitami || K. Endate, K. Watanabe || KOR || align=right | 6.3 km || 
|-id=680 bgcolor=#d6d6d6
| 5680 Nasmyth ||  ||  || December 30, 1989 || Siding Spring || R. H. McNaught || THM || align=right | 14 km || 
|-id=681 bgcolor=#fefefe
| 5681 Bakulev ||  ||  || September 15, 1990 || Nauchnij || L. V. Zhuravleva || FLO || align=right | 4.1 km || 
|-id=682 bgcolor=#FA8072
| 5682 Beresford || 1990 TB ||  || October 9, 1990 || Siding Spring || R. H. McNaught || — || align=right | 4.1 km || 
|-id=683 bgcolor=#fefefe
| 5683 Bifukumonin || 1990 UD ||  || October 19, 1990 || Oohira || T. Urata || — || align=right | 4.3 km || 
|-id=684 bgcolor=#fefefe
| 5684 Kogo ||  ||  || October 21, 1990 || Oohira || T. Urata || — || align=right | 4.4 km || 
|-id=685 bgcolor=#E9E9E9
| 5685 Sanenobufukui || 1990 XA ||  || December 8, 1990 || Minami-Oda || T. Nomura, K. Kawanishi || GEF || align=right | 13 km || 
|-id=686 bgcolor=#fefefe
| 5686 Chiyonoura || 1990 YQ ||  || December 20, 1990 || Kushiro || M. Matsuyama, K. Watanabe || NYS || align=right | 3.9 km || 
|-id=687 bgcolor=#d6d6d6
| 5687 Yamamotoshinobu ||  ||  || January 13, 1991 || Yatsugatake || Y. Kushida, O. Muramatsu || — || align=right | 14 km || 
|-id=688 bgcolor=#E9E9E9
| 5688 Kleewyck ||  ||  || January 12, 1991 || Palomar || E. F. Helin || — || align=right | 8.1 km || 
|-id=689 bgcolor=#E9E9E9
| 5689 Rhön ||  ||  || September 9, 1991 || Tautenburg Observatory || F. Börngen, L. D. Schmadel || — || align=right | 8.7 km || 
|-id=690 bgcolor=#E9E9E9
| 5690 || 1992 EU || — || March 7, 1992 || Kushiro || S. Ueda, H. Kaneda || — || align=right | 5.8 km || 
|-id=691 bgcolor=#fefefe
| 5691 Fredwatson || 1992 FD ||  || March 26, 1992 || Siding Spring || R. H. McNaught || slow || align=right | 5.5 km || 
|-id=692 bgcolor=#E9E9E9
| 5692 Shirao || 1992 FR ||  || March 23, 1992 || Kitami || K. Endate, K. Watanabe || — || align=right | 9.5 km || 
|-id=693 bgcolor=#FFC2E0
| 5693 || 1993 EA || — || March 3, 1993 || Kitt Peak || Spacewatch || APO +1kmPHA || align=right | 1.6 km || 
|-id=694 bgcolor=#E9E9E9
| 5694 Berényi || 3051 P-L ||  || September 24, 1960 || Palomar || PLS || EUN || align=right | 6.3 km || 
|-id=695 bgcolor=#E9E9E9
| 5695 Remillieux || 4577 P-L ||  || September 24, 1960 || Palomar || PLS || EUN || align=right | 7.1 km || 
|-id=696 bgcolor=#d6d6d6
| 5696 Ibsen || 4582 P-L ||  || September 24, 1960 || Palomar || PLS || — || align=right | 10 km || 
|-id=697 bgcolor=#d6d6d6
| 5697 Arrhenius || 6766 P-L ||  || September 24, 1960 || Palomar || PLS || — || align=right | 17 km || 
|-id=698 bgcolor=#d6d6d6
| 5698 Nolde || 4121 T-1 ||  || March 26, 1971 || Palomar || PLS || — || align=right | 17 km || 
|-id=699 bgcolor=#fefefe
| 5699 Munch || 2141 T-3 ||  || October 16, 1977 || Palomar || PLS || — || align=right | 4.3 km || 
|-id=700 bgcolor=#E9E9E9
| 5700 Homerus || 5166 T-3 ||  || October 16, 1977 || Palomar || PLS || EUN || align=right | 5.8 km || 
|}

5701–5800 

|-bgcolor=#E9E9E9
| 5701 Baltuck || 1929 VS ||  || November 3, 1929 || Flagstaff || C. W. Tombaugh || — || align=right | 8.6 km || 
|-id=702 bgcolor=#fefefe
| 5702 Morando || 1931 FC ||  || March 16, 1931 || Heidelberg || M. F. Wolf || FLO || align=right | 5.1 km || 
|-id=703 bgcolor=#E9E9E9
| 5703 Hevelius || 1931 VS ||  || November 15, 1931 || Heidelberg || K. Reinmuth || EUN || align=right | 5.9 km || 
|-id=704 bgcolor=#d6d6d6
| 5704 Schumacher || 1950 DE ||  || February 17, 1950 || Heidelberg || K. Reinmuth || — || align=right | 24 km || 
|-id=705 bgcolor=#fefefe
| 5705 Ericsterken || 1965 UA ||  || October 21, 1965 || Uccle || H. Debehogne || — || align=right | 4.5 km || 
|-id=706 bgcolor=#d6d6d6
| 5706 Finkelstein ||  ||  || September 23, 1971 || Nauchnij || Crimean Astrophysical Obs. || — || align=right | 14 km || 
|-id=707 bgcolor=#fefefe
| 5707 Shevchenko ||  ||  || April 2, 1976 || Nauchnij || N. S. Chernykh || FLO || align=right | 4.9 km || 
|-id=708 bgcolor=#fefefe
| 5708 Melancholia ||  ||  || October 12, 1977 || Zimmerwald || P. Wild || — || align=right | 3.8 km || 
|-id=709 bgcolor=#d6d6d6
| 5709 Tamyeunleung ||  ||  || October 12, 1977 || Nanking || Purple Mountain Obs. || — || align=right | 18 km || 
|-id=710 bgcolor=#fefefe
| 5710 Silentium || 1977 UP ||  || October 18, 1977 || Zimmerwald || P. Wild || — || align=right | 4.5 km || 
|-id=711 bgcolor=#d6d6d6
| 5711 Eneev ||  ||  || September 27, 1978 || Nauchnij || L. I. Chernykh || 3:2slow || align=right | 39 km || 
|-id=712 bgcolor=#E9E9E9
| 5712 Funke || 1979 SR ||  || September 25, 1979 || Kleť || A. Mrkos || GEF || align=right | 7.2 km || 
|-id=713 bgcolor=#fefefe
| 5713 ||  || — || March 21, 1982 || La Silla || H. Debehogne || — || align=right | 3.9 km || 
|-id=714 bgcolor=#d6d6d6
| 5714 Krasinsky || 1982 PR ||  || August 14, 1982 || Nauchnij || N. S. Chernykh || THM || align=right | 20 km || 
|-id=715 bgcolor=#d6d6d6
| 5715 Kramer ||  ||  || September 22, 1982 || Anderson Mesa || E. Bowell || HYG || align=right | 16 km || 
|-id=716 bgcolor=#fefefe
| 5716 Pickard || 1982 UH ||  || October 17, 1982 || Anderson Mesa || E. Bowell || NYS || align=right | 9.1 km || 
|-id=717 bgcolor=#fefefe
| 5717 Damir ||  ||  || October 20, 1982 || Nauchnij || L. G. Karachkina || NYS || align=right | 3.4 km || 
|-id=718 bgcolor=#fefefe
| 5718 Roykerr || 1983 PB ||  || August 4, 1983 || Lake Tekapo || A. C. Gilmore, P. M. Kilmartin || — || align=right | 2.8 km || 
|-id=719 bgcolor=#fefefe
| 5719 Křižík || 1983 RX ||  || September 7, 1983 || Kleť || A. Mrkos || FLO || align=right | 4.6 km || 
|-id=720 bgcolor=#FA8072
| 5720 Halweaver || 1984 FN ||  || March 29, 1984 || Palomar || C. S. Shoemaker, E. M. Shoemaker || — || align=right | 4.3 km || 
|-id=721 bgcolor=#E9E9E9
| 5721 ||  || — || September 18, 1984 || La Silla || H. Debehogne || — || align=right | 8.5 km || 
|-id=722 bgcolor=#fefefe
| 5722 Johnscherrer || 1986 JS ||  || May 2, 1986 || Palomar || INAS || FLO || align=right | 4.0 km || 
|-id=723 bgcolor=#fefefe
| 5723 Hudson ||  ||  || September 6, 1986 || Anderson Mesa || E. Bowell || — || align=right | 2.9 km || 
|-id=724 bgcolor=#fefefe
| 5724 || 1986 WE || — || November 22, 1986 || Toyota || K. Suzuki, T. Urata || — || align=right | 5.7 km || 
|-id=725 bgcolor=#E9E9E9
| 5725 Nördlingen ||  ||  || January 23, 1988 || Palomar || C. S. Shoemaker, E. M. Shoemaker || HNS || align=right | 7.6 km || 
|-id=726 bgcolor=#fefefe
| 5726 Rubin ||  ||  || January 24, 1988 || Palomar || C. S. Shoemaker, E. M. Shoemaker || PHO || align=right | 5.2 km || 
|-id=727 bgcolor=#fefefe
| 5727 ||  || — || January 19, 1988 || La Silla || H. Debehogne || — || align=right | 4.2 km || 
|-id=728 bgcolor=#fefefe
| 5728 ||  || — || January 20, 1988 || La Silla || H. Debehogne || — || align=right | 4.5 km || 
|-id=729 bgcolor=#d6d6d6
| 5729 ||  || — || October 13, 1988 || Kushiro || S. Ueda, H. Kaneda || — || align=right | 13 km || 
|-id=730 bgcolor=#d6d6d6
| 5730 Yonosuke ||  ||  || October 13, 1988 || Gekko || Y. Oshima || — || align=right | 8.2 km || 
|-id=731 bgcolor=#FFC2E0
| 5731 Zeus ||  ||  || November 4, 1988 || Palomar || C. S. Shoemaker, E. M. Shoemaker || APO +1km || align=right | 5.2 km || 
|-id=732 bgcolor=#FA8072
| 5732 || 1988 WC || — || November 29, 1988 || Yorii || M. Arai, H. Mori || — || align=right | 3.3 km || 
|-id=733 bgcolor=#d6d6d6
| 5733 || 1989 AQ || — || January 4, 1989 || Kushiro || S. Ueda, H. Kaneda || slow || align=right | 21 km || 
|-id=734 bgcolor=#fefefe
| 5734 Noguchi ||  ||  || January 15, 1989 || Kitami || K. Endate, K. Watanabe || V || align=right | 3.7 km || 
|-id=735 bgcolor=#fefefe
| 5735 Loripaul || 1989 LM ||  || June 4, 1989 || Palomar || E. F. Helin || FLO || align=right | 4.0 km || 
|-id=736 bgcolor=#fefefe
| 5736 Sanford || 1989 LW ||  || June 6, 1989 || Palomar || E. F. Helin || PHO || align=right | 5.1 km || 
|-id=737 bgcolor=#E9E9E9
| 5737 Itoh || 1989 SK ||  || September 30, 1989 || Minami-Oda || T. Nomura, K. Kawanishi || — || align=right | 5.4 km || 
|-id=738 bgcolor=#FA8072
| 5738 Billpickering ||  ||  || October 27, 1989 || Palomar || E. F. Helin || — || align=right | 5.2 km || 
|-id=739 bgcolor=#E9E9E9
| 5739 Robertburns ||  ||  || November 24, 1989 || Siding Spring || R. H. McNaught || — || align=right | 5.7 km || 
|-id=740 bgcolor=#E9E9E9
| 5740 Toutoumi ||  ||  || November 29, 1989 || Gekko || Y. Oshima || — || align=right | 8.9 km || 
|-id=741 bgcolor=#d6d6d6
| 5741 Akanemaruta || 1989 XC ||  || December 2, 1989 || Oohira || Oohira Stn. || KOR || align=right | 8.5 km || 
|-id=742 bgcolor=#d6d6d6
| 5742 ||  || — || October 9, 1990 || Siding Spring || R. H. McNaught || — || align=right | 17 km || 
|-id=743 bgcolor=#fefefe
| 5743 Kato || 1990 UW ||  || October 19, 1990 || Susono || M. Akiyama, T. Furuta || — || align=right | 5.3 km || 
|-id=744 bgcolor=#fefefe
| 5744 Yorimasa || 1990 XP ||  || December 14, 1990 || Yakiimo || A. Natori, T. Urata || FLO || align=right | 4.0 km || 
|-id=745 bgcolor=#fefefe
| 5745 || 1991 AN || — || January 9, 1991 || Okutama || T. Hioki, S. Hayakawa || — || align=right | 4.7 km || 
|-id=746 bgcolor=#fefefe
| 5746 || 1991 CK || — || February 5, 1991 || Yorii || M. Arai, H. Mori || — || align=right | 5.7 km || 
|-id=747 bgcolor=#fefefe
| 5747 Williamina ||  ||  || February 10, 1991 || Siding Spring || R. H. McNaught || PHOslow || align=right | 9.3 km || 
|-id=748 bgcolor=#E9E9E9
| 5748 Davebrin || 1991 DX ||  || February 19, 1991 || Palomar || E. F. Helin || EUN || align=right | 4.7 km || 
|-id=749 bgcolor=#d6d6d6
| 5749 Urduja || 1991 FV ||  || March 17, 1991 || Palomar || E. F. Helin || EOS || align=right | 13 km || 
|-id=750 bgcolor=#d6d6d6
| 5750 Kandatai ||  ||  || April 11, 1991 || Kitami || A. Takahashi, K. Watanabe || EOS || align=right | 13 km || 
|-id=751 bgcolor=#FFC2E0
| 5751 Zao || 1992 AC ||  || January 5, 1992 || Ayashi Station || M. Koishikawa || AMO +1km || align=right | 2.3 km || 
|-id=752 bgcolor=#fefefe
| 5752 || 1992 CJ || — || February 10, 1992 || Uenohara || N. Kawasato || FLO || align=right | 4.8 km || 
|-id=753 bgcolor=#fefefe
| 5753 Yoshidatadahiko || 1992 EM ||  || March 4, 1992 || Kitami || K. Endate, K. Watanabe || — || align=right | 5.8 km || 
|-id=754 bgcolor=#fefefe
| 5754 ||  || — || March 24, 1992 || Kushiro || S. Ueda, H. Kaneda || — || align=right | 6.3 km || 
|-id=755 bgcolor=#d6d6d6
| 5755 ||  || — || July 20, 1992 || La Silla || H. Debehogne, Á. López-G. || EOS || align=right | 15 km || 
|-id=756 bgcolor=#E9E9E9
| 5756 Wassenbergh || 6034 P-L ||  || September 24, 1960 || Palomar || PLS || RAF || align=right | 3.9 km || 
|-id=757 bgcolor=#d6d6d6
| 5757 Tichá || 1967 JN ||  || May 6, 1967 || El Leoncito || C. U. Cesco, A. R. Klemola || — || align=right | 21 km || 
|-id=758 bgcolor=#fefefe
| 5758 Brunini ||  ||  || August 20, 1976 || El Leoncito || Félix Aguilar Obs. || — || align=right | 4.4 km || 
|-id=759 bgcolor=#d6d6d6
| 5759 Zoshchenko ||  ||  || January 22, 1980 || Nauchnij || L. G. Karachkina || KOR || align=right | 7.0 km || 
|-id=760 bgcolor=#d6d6d6
| 5760 Mittlefehldt ||  ||  || March 1, 1981 || Siding Spring || S. J. Bus || EOS || align=right | 11 km || 
|-id=761 bgcolor=#E9E9E9
| 5761 Andreivanov ||  ||  || March 2, 1981 || Siding Spring || S. J. Bus || — || align=right | 8.9 km || 
|-id=762 bgcolor=#fefefe
| 5762 Wänke ||  ||  || March 2, 1981 || Siding Spring || S. J. Bus || — || align=right | 4.0 km || 
|-id=763 bgcolor=#fefefe
| 5763 || 1982 MA || — || June 23, 1982 || Lake Tekapo || A. C. Gilmore, P. M. Kilmartin || — || align=right | 3.3 km || 
|-id=764 bgcolor=#fefefe
| 5764 ||  || — || February 10, 1985 || La Silla || H. Debehogne || — || align=right | 5.2 km || 
|-id=765 bgcolor=#E9E9E9
| 5765 Izett || 1986 GU ||  || April 4, 1986 || Palomar || C. S. Shoemaker, E. M. Shoemaker || BAR || align=right | 9.0 km || 
|-id=766 bgcolor=#fefefe
| 5766 Carmelofalco ||  ||  || August 29, 1986 || La Silla || H. Debehogne || — || align=right | 4.8 km || 
|-id=767 bgcolor=#fefefe
| 5767 Moldun ||  ||  || September 6, 1986 || Anderson Mesa || E. Bowell || FLO || align=right | 4.1 km || 
|-id=768 bgcolor=#fefefe
| 5768 Pittich ||  ||  || October 4, 1986 || Anderson Mesa || E. Bowell || — || align=right | 10 km || 
|-id=769 bgcolor=#d6d6d6
| 5769 Michard || 1987 PL ||  || August 6, 1987 || Caussols || CERGA || EOS || align=right | 12 km || 
|-id=770 bgcolor=#d6d6d6
| 5770 Aricam || 1987 RY ||  || September 12, 1987 || La Silla || H. Debehogne || THM || align=right | 14 km || 
|-id=771 bgcolor=#d6d6d6
| 5771 Somerville ||  ||  || September 21, 1987 || Anderson Mesa || E. Bowell || LIX || align=right | 28 km || 
|-id=772 bgcolor=#E9E9E9
| 5772 Johnlambert || 1988 LB ||  || June 15, 1988 || Palomar || E. F. Helin || moon || align=right | 7.2 km || 
|-id=773 bgcolor=#fefefe
| 5773 Hopper || 1989 NO ||  || July 2, 1989 || Palomar || E. F. Helin || FLOslow || align=right | 4.6 km || 
|-id=774 bgcolor=#fefefe
| 5774 Ratliff || 1989 NR ||  || July 2, 1989 || Palomar || E. F. Helin || — || align=right | 4.5 km || 
|-id=775 bgcolor=#E9E9E9
| 5775 Inuyama || 1989 SP ||  || September 29, 1989 || Kani || Y. Mizuno, T. Furuta || — || align=right | 7.4 km || 
|-id=776 bgcolor=#E9E9E9
| 5776 ||  || — || October 29, 1989 || Okutama || T. Hioki, N. Kawasato || EUN || align=right | 7.5 km || 
|-id=777 bgcolor=#E9E9E9
| 5777 Hanaki || 1989 XF ||  || December 3, 1989 || Kani || Y. Mizuno, T. Furuta || RAF || align=right | 7.7 km || 
|-id=778 bgcolor=#E9E9E9
| 5778 Jurafrance ||  ||  || December 28, 1989 || Haute-Provence || E. W. Elst || MAR || align=right | 10 km || 
|-id=779 bgcolor=#d6d6d6
| 5779 Schupmann ||  ||  || January 23, 1990 || Kushiro || S. Ueda, H. Kaneda || EOS || align=right | 11 km || 
|-id=780 bgcolor=#d6d6d6
| 5780 Lafontaine ||  ||  || March 2, 1990 || La Silla || E. W. Elst || 7:4 || align=right | 23 km || 
|-id=781 bgcolor=#fefefe
| 5781 Barkhatova ||  ||  || September 24, 1990 || Nauchnij || G. R. Kastelʹ, L. V. Zhuravleva || — || align=right | 5.7 km || 
|-id=782 bgcolor=#fefefe
| 5782 Akirafujiwara || 1991 AF ||  || January 7, 1991 || Siding Spring || R. H. McNaught || V || align=right | 4.7 km || 
|-id=783 bgcolor=#fefefe
| 5783 Kumagaya || 1991 CO ||  || February 5, 1991 || Okutama || T. Hioki, S. Hayakawa || — || align=right | 5.9 km || 
|-id=784 bgcolor=#E9E9E9
| 5784 Yoron || 1991 CY ||  || February 9, 1991 || Yakiimo || A. Natori, T. Urata || — || align=right | 6.8 km || 
|-id=785 bgcolor=#E9E9E9
| 5785 Fulton || 1991 FU ||  || March 17, 1991 || Palomar || E. F. Helin || EUN || align=right | 7.8 km || 
|-id=786 bgcolor=#FFC2E0
| 5786 Talos || 1991 RC ||  || September 3, 1991 || Siding Spring || R. H. McNaught || APO +1km || align=right | 1.3 km || 
|-id=787 bgcolor=#fefefe
| 5787 ||  || — || March 26, 1992 || Kushiro || S. Ueda, H. Kaneda || FLO || align=right | 4.6 km || 
|-id=788 bgcolor=#d6d6d6
| 5788 || 1992 NJ || — || July 1, 1992 || Siding Spring || R. H. McNaught || — || align=right | 18 km || 
|-id=789 bgcolor=#E9E9E9
| 5789 Sellin || 4018 P-L ||  || September 24, 1960 || Palomar || PLS || — || align=right | 4.3 km || 
|-id=790 bgcolor=#E9E9E9
| 5790 Nagasaki || 9540 P-L ||  || October 17, 1960 || Palomar || PLS || — || align=right | 4.7 km || 
|-id=791 bgcolor=#d6d6d6
| 5791 Comello || 4053 T-2 ||  || September 29, 1973 || Palomar || PLS || KOR || align=right | 7.6 km || 
|-id=792 bgcolor=#fefefe
| 5792 Unstrut || 1964 BF ||  || January 18, 1964 || Tautenburg Observatory || F. Börngen || — || align=right | 13 km || 
|-id=793 bgcolor=#E9E9E9
| 5793 Ringuelet ||  ||  || October 5, 1975 || El Leoncito || Félix Aguilar Obs. || EUN || align=right | 8.1 km || 
|-id=794 bgcolor=#d6d6d6
| 5794 Irmina ||  ||  || September 24, 1976 || Nauchnij || N. S. Chernykh || HYG || align=right | 11 km || 
|-id=795 bgcolor=#fefefe
| 5795 Roshchina ||  ||  || September 27, 1978 || Nauchnij || L. I. Chernykh || — || align=right | 4.9 km || 
|-id=796 bgcolor=#fefefe
| 5796 Klemm ||  ||  || November 7, 1978 || Palomar || E. F. Helin, S. J. Bus || — || align=right | 5.7 km || 
|-id=797 bgcolor=#FFC2E0
| 5797 Bivoj || 1980 AA ||  || January 13, 1980 || Kleť || A. Mrkos || AMO || align=right data-sort-value="0.4" | 400 m || 
|-id=798 bgcolor=#E9E9E9
| 5798 Burnett ||  ||  || September 13, 1980 || Palomar || S. J. Bus || — || align=right | 8.6 km || 
|-id=799 bgcolor=#E9E9E9
| 5799 Brewington ||  ||  || October 9, 1980 || Palomar || C. S. Shoemaker || — || align=right | 5.4 km || 
|-id=800 bgcolor=#d6d6d6
| 5800 Pollock ||  ||  || October 16, 1982 || Kleť || A. Mrkos || THM || align=right | 11 km || 
|}

5801–5900 

|-bgcolor=#fefefe
| 5801 Vasarely || 1984 BK ||  || January 26, 1984 || Kleť || A. Mrkos || — || align=right | 13 km || 
|-id=802 bgcolor=#fefefe
| 5802 Casteldelpiano ||  ||  || April 27, 1984 || La Silla || V. Zappalà || — || align=right | 4.9 km || 
|-id=803 bgcolor=#E9E9E9
| 5803 Ötzi || 1984 OA ||  || July 21, 1984 || Kleť || A. Mrkos || — || align=right | 16 km || 
|-id=804 bgcolor=#fefefe
| 5804 Bambinidipraga ||  ||  || September 9, 1985 || Kleť || A. Mrkos || — || align=right | 6.0 km || 
|-id=805 bgcolor=#E9E9E9
| 5805 Glasgow || 1985 YH ||  || December 18, 1985 || Anderson Mesa || E. Bowell || EUN || align=right | 9.3 km || 
|-id=806 bgcolor=#fefefe
| 5806 Archieroy ||  ||  || January 11, 1986 || Anderson Mesa || E. Bowell || H || align=right | 6.8 km || 
|-id=807 bgcolor=#d6d6d6
| 5807 Mshatka ||  ||  || August 30, 1986 || Nauchnij || L. I. Chernykh || slow || align=right | 13 km || 
|-id=808 bgcolor=#d6d6d6
| 5808 Babelʹ ||  ||  || August 27, 1987 || Nauchnij || L. G. Karachkina || EOS || align=right | 13 km || 
|-id=809 bgcolor=#d6d6d6
| 5809 Kulibin ||  ||  || September 4, 1987 || Nauchnij || L. V. Zhuravleva || — || align=right | 7.8 km || 
|-id=810 bgcolor=#fefefe
| 5810 || 1988 EN || — || March 10, 1988 || Gekko || Y. Oshima || — || align=right | 5.1 km || 
|-id=811 bgcolor=#E9E9E9
| 5811 Keck || 1988 KC ||  || May 19, 1988 || Palomar || E. F. Helin || — || align=right | 7.6 km || 
|-id=812 bgcolor=#E9E9E9
| 5812 Jayewinkler ||  ||  || August 11, 1988 || Siding Spring || A. J. Noymer || — || align=right | 7.6 km || 
|-id=813 bgcolor=#E9E9E9
| 5813 Eizaburo || 1988 VL ||  || November 3, 1988 || Chiyoda || T. Kojima || — || align=right | 7.2 km || 
|-id=814 bgcolor=#d6d6d6
| 5814 ||  || — || December 11, 1988 || Kushiro || S. Ueda, H. Kaneda || EOS || align=right | 16 km || 
|-id=815 bgcolor=#d6d6d6
| 5815 Shinsengumi || 1989 AH ||  || January 3, 1989 || Geisei || T. Seki || ALA || align=right | 18 km || 
|-id=816 bgcolor=#d6d6d6
| 5816 Potsdam ||  ||  || January 11, 1989 || Tautenburg Observatory || F. Börngen || EOS || align=right | 9.8 km || 
|-id=817 bgcolor=#FA8072
| 5817 Robertfrazer || 1989 RZ ||  || September 5, 1989 || Palomar || E. F. Helin || moon || align=right | 6.5 km || 
|-id=818 bgcolor=#fefefe
| 5818 ||  || — || September 5, 1989 || Lake Tekapo || A. C. Gilmore, P. M. Kilmartin || — || align=right | 9.1 km || 
|-id=819 bgcolor=#E9E9E9
| 5819 Lauretta ||  ||  || October 29, 1989 || Cerro Tololo || S. J. Bus || — || align=right | 5.8 km || 
|-id=820 bgcolor=#fefefe
| 5820 Babelsberg ||  ||  || October 23, 1989 || Tautenburg Observatory || F. Börngen || — || align=right | 11 km || 
|-id=821 bgcolor=#fefefe
| 5821 Yukiomaeda || 1989 VV ||  || November 4, 1989 || Oohira || Oohira Stn. || — || align=right | 6.9 km || 
|-id=822 bgcolor=#fefefe
| 5822 Masakichi || 1989 WL ||  || November 21, 1989 || Okutama || T. Hioki, S. Hayakawa || — || align=right | 5.4 km || 
|-id=823 bgcolor=#E9E9E9
| 5823 Oryo || 1989 YH ||  || December 20, 1989 || Geisei || T. Seki || GEF || align=right | 8.7 km || 
|-id=824 bgcolor=#E9E9E9
| 5824 Inagaki || 1989 YM ||  || December 24, 1989 || Geisei || T. Seki || EUN || align=right | 9.8 km || 
|-id=825 bgcolor=#E9E9E9
| 5825 Rakuyou ||  ||  || January 21, 1990 || Dynic || A. Sugie || ADE || align=right | 12 km || 
|-id=826 bgcolor=#d6d6d6
| 5826 Bradstreet || 1990 DB ||  || February 16, 1990 || Kushiro || S. Ueda, H. Kaneda || THM || align=right | 19 km || 
|-id=827 bgcolor=#fefefe
| 5827 Letunov ||  ||  || November 15, 1990 || Nauchnij || L. I. Chernykh || — || align=right | 5.2 km || 
|-id=828 bgcolor=#FFC2E0
| 5828 || 1991 AM || — || January 14, 1991 || Kitt Peak || Spacewatch || APO +1km || align=right | 1.5 km || 
|-id=829 bgcolor=#fefefe
| 5829 Ishidagoro ||  ||  || February 11, 1991 || Kiyosato || S. Otomo, O. Muramatsu || FLO || align=right | 3.7 km || 
|-id=830 bgcolor=#fefefe
| 5830 Simohiro || 1991 EG ||  || March 9, 1991 || Ojima || T. Niijima, T. Urata || — || align=right | 3.0 km || 
|-id=831 bgcolor=#E9E9E9
| 5831 Dizzy || 1991 JG ||  || May 4, 1991 || Kushiro || S. Ueda, H. Kaneda || ADE || align=right | 16 km || 
|-id=832 bgcolor=#E9E9E9
| 5832 Martaprincipe ||  ||  || June 15, 1991 || Palomar || E. F. Helin || BRU || align=right | 24 km || 
|-id=833 bgcolor=#d6d6d6
| 5833 Peterson || 1991 PQ ||  || August 5, 1991 || Palomar || H. E. Holt || 7:4 || align=right | 27 km || 
|-id=834 bgcolor=#d6d6d6
| 5834 Kasai ||  ||  || September 28, 1992 || Kushiro || S. Ueda, H. Kaneda || — || align=right | 12 km || 
|-id=835 bgcolor=#d6d6d6
| 5835 Mainfranken ||  ||  || September 21, 1992 || Tautenburg Observatory || F. Börngen || — || align=right | 15 km || 
|-id=836 bgcolor=#FFC2E0
| 5836 || 1993 MF || — || June 22, 1993 || Palomar || E. F. Helin, K. J. Lawrence || AMO +1km || align=right | 2.8 km || 
|-id=837 bgcolor=#d6d6d6
| 5837 Hedin || 2548 P-L ||  || September 24, 1960 || Palomar || PLS || THM || align=right | 12 km || 
|-id=838 bgcolor=#E9E9E9
| 5838 Hamsun || 2170 T-2 ||  || September 29, 1973 || Palomar || PLS || — || align=right | 4.9 km || 
|-id=839 bgcolor=#E9E9E9
| 5839 GOI ||  ||  || September 21, 1974 || Nauchnij || N. S. Chernykh || — || align=right | 25 km || 
|-id=840 bgcolor=#E9E9E9
| 5840 Raybrown || 1978 ON ||  || July 28, 1978 || Bickley || Perth Obs. || — || align=right | 9.7 km || 
|-id=841 bgcolor=#fefefe
| 5841 Stone || 1982 ST ||  || September 19, 1982 || Palomar || E. F. Helin || H || align=right | 2.2 km || 
|-id=842 bgcolor=#E9E9E9
| 5842 Cancelli ||  ||  || February 8, 1986 || La Silla || H. Debehogne || MAR || align=right | 5.6 km || 
|-id=843 bgcolor=#fefefe
| 5843 || 1986 UG || — || October 30, 1986 || Toyota || K. Suzuki, T. Urata || — || align=right | 3.4 km || 
|-id=844 bgcolor=#fefefe
| 5844 || 1986 UQ || — || October 28, 1986 || Kleť || Z. Vávrová || — || align=right | 4.3 km || 
|-id=845 bgcolor=#d6d6d6
| 5845 Davidbrewster || 1988 QP ||  || August 19, 1988 || Siding Spring || R. H. McNaught || EOS || align=right | 17 km || 
|-id=846 bgcolor=#fefefe
| 5846 Hessen ||  ||  || January 11, 1989 || Tautenburg Observatory || F. Börngen || — || align=right | 3.7 km || 
|-id=847 bgcolor=#E9E9E9
| 5847 Wakiya || 1989 YB ||  || December 18, 1989 || Kitami || K. Endate, K. Watanabe || — || align=right | 7.1 km || 
|-id=848 bgcolor=#E9E9E9
| 5848 Harutoriko ||  ||  || January 30, 1990 || Kushiro || M. Matsuyama, K. Watanabe || — || align=right | 6.0 km || 
|-id=849 bgcolor=#d6d6d6
| 5849 Bhanji ||  ||  || April 27, 1990 || Palomar || E. F. Helin || ALA || align=right | 28 km || 
|-id=850 bgcolor=#fefefe
| 5850 Masaharu || 1990 XM ||  || December 8, 1990 || Kitami || K. Endate, K. Watanabe || — || align=right | 3.3 km || 
|-id=851 bgcolor=#E9E9E9
| 5851 Inagawa ||  ||  || February 23, 1991 || Karasuyama || S. Inoda, T. Urata || EUNslow || align=right | 9.8 km || 
|-id=852 bgcolor=#E9E9E9
| 5852 Nanette || 1991 HO ||  || April 19, 1991 || Palomar || C. S. Shoemaker, D. H. Levy || POS || align=right | 24 km || 
|-id=853 bgcolor=#fefefe
| 5853 || 1992 QG || — || August 26, 1992 || Kushiro || S. Ueda, H. Kaneda || — || align=right | 6.3 km || 
|-id=854 bgcolor=#d6d6d6
| 5854 || 1992 UP || — || October 19, 1992 || Kushiro || S. Ueda, H. Kaneda || THM || align=right | 18 km || 
|-id=855 bgcolor=#E9E9E9
| 5855 Yukitsuna ||  ||  || October 26, 1992 || Yakiimo || A. Natori, T. Urata || MAR || align=right | 11 km || 
|-id=856 bgcolor=#E9E9E9
| 5856 Peluk ||  ||  || January 5, 1994 || Kushiro || S. Ueda, H. Kaneda || — || align=right | 9.8 km || 
|-id=857 bgcolor=#fefefe
| 5857 Neglinka ||  ||  || October 3, 1975 || Nauchnij || L. I. Chernykh || — || align=right | 4.3 km || 
|-id=858 bgcolor=#fefefe
| 5858 Borovitskia ||  ||  || September 28, 1978 || Nauchnij || L. I. Chernykh || V || align=right | 5.6 km || 
|-id=859 bgcolor=#fefefe
| 5859 Ostozhenka ||  ||  || March 23, 1979 || Nauchnij || N. S. Chernykh || NYS || align=right | 6.0 km || 
|-id=860 bgcolor=#fefefe
| 5860 Deankoontz ||  ||  || August 28, 1981 || Kleť || Z. Vávrová || NYS || align=right | 3.9 km || 
|-id=861 bgcolor=#fefefe
| 5861 Glynjones || 1982 RW ||  || September 15, 1982 || Anderson Mesa || E. Bowell || — || align=right | 3.9 km || 
|-id=862 bgcolor=#fefefe
| 5862 Sakanoue || 1983 AB ||  || January 13, 1983 || Geisei || T. Seki || NYS || align=right | 4.0 km || 
|-id=863 bgcolor=#FFC2E0
| 5863 Tara || 1983 RB ||  || September 7, 1983 || Palomar || C. S. Shoemaker, E. M. Shoemaker || AMO +1km || align=right | 1.3 km || 
|-id=864 bgcolor=#E9E9E9
| 5864 Montgolfier ||  ||  || September 2, 1983 || Anderson Mesa || N. G. Thomas || — || align=right | 4.4 km || 
|-id=865 bgcolor=#fefefe
| 5865 Qualytemocrina || 1984 QQ ||  || August 31, 1984 || Kleť || A. Mrkos || — || align=right | 6.0 km || 
|-id=866 bgcolor=#E9E9E9
| 5866 Sachsen ||  ||  || August 13, 1988 || Tautenburg Observatory || F. Börngen || HOF || align=right | 13 km || 
|-id=867 bgcolor=#FA8072
| 5867 || 1988 RE || — || September 11, 1988 || Palomar || J. Phinney || — || align=right | 1.7 km || 
|-id=868 bgcolor=#E9E9E9
| 5868 Ohta || 1988 TQ ||  || October 13, 1988 || Kitami || K. Endate, K. Watanabe || — || align=right | 8.4 km || 
|-id=869 bgcolor=#FFC2E0
| 5869 Tanith ||  ||  || November 4, 1988 || Palomar || C. S. Shoemaker || AMO +1km || align=right | 1.3 km || 
|-id=870 bgcolor=#FA8072
| 5870 Baltimore ||  ||  || February 11, 1989 || Palomar || E. F. Helin || — || align=right | 7.5 km || 
|-id=871 bgcolor=#fefefe
| 5871 Bobbell ||  ||  || February 11, 1989 || Palomar || E. F. Helin || H || align=right | 2.4 km || 
|-id=872 bgcolor=#fefefe
| 5872 Sugano || 1989 SL ||  || September 30, 1989 || Minami-Oda || T. Nomura, K. Kawanishi || moon || align=right | 5.4 km || 
|-id=873 bgcolor=#fefefe
| 5873 Archilochos ||  ||  || September 26, 1989 || La Silla || E. W. Elst || FLO || align=right | 4.1 km || 
|-id=874 bgcolor=#fefefe
| 5874 || 1989 XB || — || December 2, 1989 || Uenohara || N. Kawasato || — || align=right | 4.2 km || 
|-id=875 bgcolor=#fefefe
| 5875 Kuga || 1989 XO ||  || December 5, 1989 || Kitami || K. Endate, K. Watanabe || — || align=right | 7.5 km || 
|-id=876 bgcolor=#E9E9E9
| 5876 ||  || — || February 24, 1990 || La Silla || H. Debehogne || AGN || align=right | 7.1 km || 
|-id=877 bgcolor=#E9E9E9
| 5877 Toshimaihara || 1990 FP ||  || March 23, 1990 || Palomar || E. F. Helin || — || align=right | 6.6 km || 
|-id=878 bgcolor=#fefefe
| 5878 Charlene ||  ||  || February 14, 1991 || Palomar || E. F. Helin || — || align=right | 6.4 km || 
|-id=879 bgcolor=#FFC2E0
| 5879 Almeria ||  ||  || February 8, 1992 || Calar Alto || K. Birkle, U. Hopp || AMO +1km || align=right | 1.0 km || 
|-id=880 bgcolor=#d6d6d6
| 5880 || 1992 MA || — || June 22, 1992 || Kushiro || S. Ueda, H. Kaneda || THM || align=right | 14 km || 
|-id=881 bgcolor=#d6d6d6
| 5881 Akashi ||  ||  || September 27, 1992 || Minami-Oda || M. Sugano, T. Nomura || KOR || align=right | 8.8 km || 
|-id=882 bgcolor=#d6d6d6
| 5882 ||  || — || November 18, 1992 || Uenohara || N. Kawasato || KOR || align=right | 5.7 km || 
|-id=883 bgcolor=#d6d6d6
| 5883 Josephblack ||  ||  || November 6, 1993 || Siding Spring || R. H. McNaught || — || align=right | 21 km || 
|-id=884 bgcolor=#E9E9E9
| 5884 Dolezal || 6045 P-L ||  || September 24, 1960 || Palomar || PLS || DOR || align=right | 12 km || 
|-id=885 bgcolor=#d6d6d6
| 5885 Apeldoorn || 3137 T-2 ||  || September 30, 1973 || Palomar || PLS || — || align=right | 17 km || 
|-id=886 bgcolor=#d6d6d6
| 5886 Rutger || 1975 LR ||  || June 13, 1975 || El Leoncito || Félix Aguilar Obs. || EOS || align=right | 17 km || 
|-id=887 bgcolor=#fefefe
| 5887 Yauza ||  ||  || September 24, 1976 || Nauchnij || N. S. Chernykh || FLO || align=right | 5.4 km || 
|-id=888 bgcolor=#d6d6d6
| 5888 Ruders ||  ||  || November 7, 1978 || Palomar || E. F. Helin, S. J. Bus || KOR || align=right | 8.2 km || 
|-id=889 bgcolor=#d6d6d6
| 5889 Mickiewicz ||  ||  || March 31, 1979 || Nauchnij || N. S. Chernykh || — || align=right | 26 km || 
|-id=890 bgcolor=#E9E9E9
| 5890 Carlsberg || 1979 KG ||  || May 19, 1979 || La Silla || R. M. West || EUN || align=right | 8.1 km || 
|-id=891 bgcolor=#fefefe
| 5891 Gehrig || 1981 SM ||  || September 22, 1981 || Kleť || A. Mrkos || — || align=right | 5.5 km || 
|-id=892 bgcolor=#fefefe
| 5892 Milesdavis ||  ||  || December 23, 1981 || Nanking || Purple Mountain Obs. || — || align=right | 3.7 km || 
|-id=893 bgcolor=#E9E9E9
| 5893 Coltrane || 1982 EF ||  || March 15, 1982 || Kleť || Z. Vávrová || EUN || align=right | 7.5 km || 
|-id=894 bgcolor=#fefefe
| 5894 Telč ||  ||  || September 14, 1982 || Kleť || A. Mrkos || — || align=right | 5.9 km || 
|-id=895 bgcolor=#fefefe
| 5895 Žbirka ||  ||  || October 16, 1982 || Kleť || Z. Vávrová || V || align=right | 4.0 km || 
|-id=896 bgcolor=#fefefe
| 5896 Narrenschiff ||  ||  || November 12, 1982 || Nauchnij || L. G. Karachkina || — || align=right | 4.9 km || 
|-id=897 bgcolor=#E9E9E9
| 5897 Novotná ||  ||  || September 29, 1984 || Kleť || A. Mrkos || — || align=right | 5.4 km || 
|-id=898 bgcolor=#d6d6d6
| 5898 || 1985 KE || — || May 23, 1985 || Lake Tekapo || A. C. Gilmore, P. M. Kilmartin || — || align=right | 14 km || 
|-id=899 bgcolor=#fefefe
| 5899 Jedicke || 1986 AH ||  || January 9, 1986 || Palomar || C. S. Shoemaker, E. M. Shoemaker || Hmoon || align=right | 2.7 km || 
|-id=900 bgcolor=#d6d6d6
| 5900 Jensen || 1986 TL ||  || October 3, 1986 || Brorfelde || P. Jensen || LIX || align=right | 20 km || 
|}

5901–6000 

|-bgcolor=#fefefe
| 5901 ||  || — || November 25, 1986 || Kleť || Z. Vávrová || — || align=right | 4.0 km || 
|-id=902 bgcolor=#d6d6d6
| 5902 Talima ||  ||  || August 27, 1987 || Nauchnij || L. G. Karachkina || EOS || align=right | 13 km || 
|-id=903 bgcolor=#E9E9E9
| 5903 ||  || — || January 6, 1989 || Kushiro || S. Ueda, H. Kaneda || — || align=right | 6.6 km || 
|-id=904 bgcolor=#d6d6d6
| 5904 Württemberg ||  ||  || January 10, 1989 || Tautenburg Observatory || F. Börngen || — || align=right | 9.8 km || 
|-id=905 bgcolor=#fefefe
| 5905 Johnson ||  ||  || February 11, 1989 || Palomar || E. F. Helin || Hmoon || align=right | 4.7 km || 
|-id=906 bgcolor=#fefefe
| 5906 ||  || — || September 24, 1989 || Lake Tekapo || A. C. Gilmore, P. M. Kilmartin || — || align=right | 3.0 km || 
|-id=907 bgcolor=#C2FFFF
| 5907 Rhigmus ||  ||  || October 2, 1989 || Cerro Tololo || S. J. Bus || L5 || align=right | 31 km || 
|-id=908 bgcolor=#fefefe
| 5908 Aichi || 1989 UF ||  || October 20, 1989 || Kani || Y. Mizuno, T. Furuta || — || align=right | 4.9 km || 
|-id=909 bgcolor=#fefefe
| 5909 Nagoya || 1989 UT ||  || October 23, 1989 || Kani || Y. Mizuno, T. Furuta || — || align=right | 5.2 km || 
|-id=910 bgcolor=#fefefe
| 5910 Zátopek ||  ||  || November 29, 1989 || Kleť || A. Mrkos || FLO || align=right | 4.3 km || 
|-id=911 bgcolor=#fefefe
| 5911 ||  || — || November 25, 1989 || Kushiro || S. Ueda, H. Kaneda || FLO || align=right | 3.8 km || 
|-id=912 bgcolor=#fefefe
| 5912 Oyatoshiyuki || 1989 YR ||  || December 20, 1989 || Ojima || T. Niijima, T. Urata || NYS || align=right | 3.5 km || 
|-id=913 bgcolor=#E9E9E9
| 5913 || 1990 BU || — || January 21, 1990 || Yorii || M. Arai, H. Mori || EUN || align=right | 11 km || 
|-id=914 bgcolor=#d6d6d6
| 5914 Kathywhaler || 1990 WK ||  || November 20, 1990 || Siding Spring || R. H. McNaught || SYL7:4 || align=right | 38 km || 
|-id=915 bgcolor=#fefefe
| 5915 Yoshihiro || 1991 EU ||  || March 9, 1991 || Geisei || T. Seki || FLO || align=right | 3.8 km || 
|-id=916 bgcolor=#fefefe
| 5916 van der Woude ||  ||  || May 8, 1991 || Palomar || E. F. Helin || — || align=right | 7.1 km || 
|-id=917 bgcolor=#E9E9E9
| 5917 Chibasai || 1991 NG ||  || July 7, 1991 || Palomar || E. F. Helin || MAR || align=right | 10 km || 
|-id=918 bgcolor=#d6d6d6
| 5918 ||  || — || July 6, 1991 || La Silla || H. Debehogne || KOR || align=right | 7.6 km || 
|-id=919 bgcolor=#d6d6d6
| 5919 Patrickmartin ||  ||  || August 5, 1991 || Palomar || H. E. Holt || THM || align=right | 20 km || 
|-id=920 bgcolor=#d6d6d6
| 5920 ||  || — || September 30, 1992 || Palomar || H. E. Holt || — || align=right | 17 km || 
|-id=921 bgcolor=#fefefe
| 5921 || 1992 UL || — || October 19, 1992 || Kushiro || S. Ueda, H. Kaneda || FLO || align=right | 4.2 km || 
|-id=922 bgcolor=#d6d6d6
| 5922 Shouichi || 1992 UV ||  || October 21, 1992 || Kiyosato || S. Otomo || TEL || align=right | 29 km || 
|-id=923 bgcolor=#d6d6d6
| 5923 Liedeke ||  ||  || November 26, 1992 || Kitt Peak || Spacewatch || KOR || align=right | 8.1 km || 
|-id=924 bgcolor=#fefefe
| 5924 Teruo ||  ||  || February 7, 1994 || Oizumi || T. Kobayashi || NYS || align=right | 14 km || 
|-id=925 bgcolor=#fefefe
| 5925 ||  || — || February 5, 1994 || Kushiro || S. Ueda, H. Kaneda || — || align=right | 6.1 km || 
|-id=926 bgcolor=#fefefe
| 5926 Schönfeld || 1929 PB ||  || August 4, 1929 || Heidelberg || M. F. Wolf || — || align=right | 4.4 km || 
|-id=927 bgcolor=#d6d6d6
| 5927 Krogh || 1938 HA ||  || April 19, 1938 || Hamburg-Bergedorf || W. Dieckvoß || — || align=right | 16 km || 
|-id=928 bgcolor=#d6d6d6
| 5928 Pindarus ||  ||  || September 19, 1973 || Palomar || PLS || HIL3:2 || align=right | 30 km || 
|-id=929 bgcolor=#FA8072
| 5929 Manzano || 1974 XT ||  || December 14, 1974 || El Leoncito || Félix Aguilar Obs. || PHO || align=right | 4.2 km || 
|-id=930 bgcolor=#fefefe
| 5930 Zhiganov ||  ||  || November 2, 1975 || Nauchnij || T. M. Smirnova || — || align=right | 4.9 km || 
|-id=931 bgcolor=#d6d6d6
| 5931 Zhvanetskij ||  ||  || April 1, 1976 || Nauchnij || N. S. Chernykh || — || align=right | 21 km || 
|-id=932 bgcolor=#E9E9E9
| 5932 Prutkov ||  ||  || April 1, 1976 || Nauchnij || N. S. Chernykh || — || align=right | 5.9 km || 
|-id=933 bgcolor=#fefefe
| 5933 Kemurdzhian || 1976 QN ||  || August 26, 1976 || Nauchnij || N. S. Chernykh || — || align=right | 3.6 km || 
|-id=934 bgcolor=#fefefe
| 5934 Mats || 1976 SJ ||  || September 20, 1976 || Kvistaberg || C.-I. Lagerkvist, H. Rickman || NYS || align=right | 4.0 km || 
|-id=935 bgcolor=#E9E9E9
| 5935 Ostankino ||  ||  || March 13, 1977 || Nauchnij || N. S. Chernykh || EUN || align=right | 6.9 km || 
|-id=936 bgcolor=#d6d6d6
| 5936 Khadzhinov ||  ||  || March 29, 1979 || Nauchnij || N. S. Chernykh || EOS || align=right | 13 km || 
|-id=937 bgcolor=#fefefe
| 5937 Lodén || 1979 XQ ||  || December 11, 1979 || Kvistaberg || C.-I. Lagerkvist || — || align=right | 5.2 km || 
|-id=938 bgcolor=#fefefe
| 5938 Keller ||  ||  || March 16, 1980 || La Silla || C.-I. Lagerkvist || — || align=right | 4.4 km || 
|-id=939 bgcolor=#E9E9E9
| 5939 Toshimayeda ||  ||  || March 1, 1981 || Siding Spring || S. J. Bus || — || align=right | 6.0 km || 
|-id=940 bgcolor=#d6d6d6
| 5940 Feliksobolev ||  ||  || October 8, 1981 || Nauchnij || L. I. Chernykh || EOS || align=right | 12 km || 
|-id=941 bgcolor=#d6d6d6
| 5941 Valencia ||  ||  || October 20, 1982 || Nauchnij || L. G. Karachkina || KOR || align=right | 8.5 km || 
|-id=942 bgcolor=#d6d6d6
| 5942 Denzilrobert ||  ||  || January 10, 1983 || Palomar || B. E. Behymer, M. S. Marley || EOS || align=right | 14 km || 
|-id=943 bgcolor=#fefefe
| 5943 Lovi || 1984 EG ||  || March 1, 1984 || Anderson Mesa || E. Bowell || FLO || align=right | 4.3 km || 
|-id=944 bgcolor=#d6d6d6
| 5944 Utesov ||  ||  || May 2, 1984 || Nauchnij || L. G. Karachkina || EOS || align=right | 14 km || 
|-id=945 bgcolor=#fefefe
| 5945 Roachapproach ||  ||  || September 28, 1984 || Anderson Mesa || B. A. Skiff || — || align=right | 6.5 km || 
|-id=946 bgcolor=#fefefe
| 5946 Hrozný ||  ||  || October 28, 1984 || Kleť || A. Mrkos || — || align=right | 8.4 km || 
|-id=947 bgcolor=#E9E9E9
| 5947 Bonnie || 1985 FD ||  || March 21, 1985 || Palomar || C. S. Shoemaker, E. M. Shoemaker || — || align=right | 11 km || 
|-id=948 bgcolor=#E9E9E9
| 5948 Longo || 1985 JL ||  || May 15, 1985 || Anderson Mesa || E. Bowell || CLO || align=right | 10 km || 
|-id=949 bgcolor=#fefefe
| 5949 ||  || — || September 6, 1985 || La Silla || H. Debehogne || — || align=right | 6.2 km || 
|-id=950 bgcolor=#d6d6d6
| 5950 Leukippos ||  ||  || August 9, 1986 || Smolyan || E. W. Elst, V. G. Ivanova || EOS || align=right | 10 km || 
|-id=951 bgcolor=#fefefe
| 5951 Alicemonet ||  ||  || October 7, 1986 || Anderson Mesa || E. Bowell || — || align=right | 5.9 km || 
|-id=952 bgcolor=#fefefe
| 5952 Davemonet || 1987 EV ||  || March 4, 1987 || Anderson Mesa || E. Bowell || FLO || align=right | 4.9 km || 
|-id=953 bgcolor=#fefefe
| 5953 Shelton || 1987 HS ||  || April 25, 1987 || Palomar || C. S. Shoemaker, E. M. Shoemaker || PHO || align=right | 5.2 km || 
|-id=954 bgcolor=#fefefe
| 5954 Epikouros ||  ||  || August 19, 1987 || La Silla || E. W. Elst || — || align=right | 5.7 km || 
|-id=955 bgcolor=#E9E9E9
| 5955 Khromchenko ||  ||  || September 2, 1987 || Nauchnij || L. I. Chernykh || GEF || align=right | 7.5 km || 
|-id=956 bgcolor=#E9E9E9
| 5956 d'Alembert ||  ||  || February 13, 1988 || La Silla || E. W. Elst || — || align=right | 12 km || 
|-id=957 bgcolor=#d6d6d6
| 5957 Irina || 1988 JN ||  || May 11, 1988 || Palomar || C. S. Shoemaker, E. M. Shoemaker || ALA || align=right | 15 km || 
|-id=958 bgcolor=#fefefe
| 5958 Barrande ||  ||  || January 29, 1989 || Kleť || A. Mrkos || — || align=right | 5.3 km || 
|-id=959 bgcolor=#d6d6d6
| 5959 Shaklan ||  ||  || July 2, 1989 || Palomar || E. F. Helin || URS || align=right | 20 km || 
|-id=960 bgcolor=#fefefe
| 5960 Wakkanai || 1989 US ||  || October 21, 1989 || Kagoshima || M. Mukai, M. Takeishi || FLO || align=right | 4.7 km || 
|-id=961 bgcolor=#fefefe
| 5961 Watt ||  ||  || December 30, 1989 || Siding Spring || R. H. McNaught || NYS || align=right | 3.7 km || 
|-id=962 bgcolor=#E9E9E9
| 5962 Shikokutenkyo || 1990 HK ||  || April 18, 1990 || Geisei || T. Seki || EUN || align=right | 8.1 km || 
|-id=963 bgcolor=#d6d6d6
| 5963 ||  || — || August 24, 1990 || Palomar || H. E. Holt || KOR || align=right | 10 km || 
|-id=964 bgcolor=#d6d6d6
| 5964 ||  || — || August 23, 1990 || Palomar || H. E. Holt || — || align=right | 13 km || 
|-id=965 bgcolor=#E9E9E9
| 5965 ||  || — || September 16, 1990 || Palomar || H. E. Holt || — || align=right | 8.1 km || 
|-id=966 bgcolor=#d6d6d6
| 5966 Tomeko ||  ||  || November 15, 1990 || Geisei || T. Seki || — || align=right | 7.4 km || 
|-id=967 bgcolor=#fefefe
| 5967 Edithlevy ||  ||  || February 9, 1991 || Palomar || C. S. Shoemaker || H || align=right | 3.1 km || 
|-id=968 bgcolor=#fefefe
| 5968 Trauger || 1991 FC ||  || March 17, 1991 || Palomar || E. F. Helin || H || align=right | 4.8 km || 
|-id=969 bgcolor=#fefefe
| 5969 Ryuichiro || 1991 FT ||  || March 17, 1991 || Geisei || T. Seki || V || align=right | 4.3 km || 
|-id=970 bgcolor=#fefefe
| 5970 Ohdohrikouen ||  ||  || May 13, 1991 || JCPM Sapporo || K. Watanabe || FLO || align=right | 3.9 km || 
|-id=971 bgcolor=#E9E9E9
| 5971 Tickell ||  ||  || July 12, 1991 || Palomar || H. E. Holt || EUN || align=right | 8.7 km || 
|-id=972 bgcolor=#E9E9E9
| 5972 Harryatkinson ||  ||  || August 5, 1991 || Palomar || H. E. Holt || — || align=right | 9.9 km || 
|-id=973 bgcolor=#E9E9E9
| 5973 Takimoto || 1991 QC ||  || August 17, 1991 || Kiyosato || S. Otomo || — || align=right | 7.3 km || 
|-id=974 bgcolor=#d6d6d6
| 5974 ||  || — || October 31, 1991 || Kushiro || S. Ueda, H. Kaneda || THM || align=right | 16 km || 
|-id=975 bgcolor=#E9E9E9
| 5975 Otakemayumi || 1992 SG ||  || September 21, 1992 || Kitami || K. Endate, K. Watanabe || MAR || align=right | 10 km || 
|-id=976 bgcolor=#E9E9E9
| 5976 Kalatajean ||  ||  || September 25, 1992 || Harvard Observatory || Oak Ridge Observatory || EUN || align=right | 11 km || 
|-id=977 bgcolor=#E9E9E9
| 5977 ||  || — || October 1, 1992 || Palomar || H. E. Holt || MAR || align=right | 11 km || 
|-id=978 bgcolor=#fefefe
| 5978 Kaminokuni || 1992 WT ||  || November 16, 1992 || Kitami || K. Endate, K. Watanabe || — || align=right | 6.1 km || 
|-id=979 bgcolor=#d6d6d6
| 5979 || 1992 XF || — || December 15, 1992 || Kushiro || S. Ueda, H. Kaneda || — || align=right | 12 km || 
|-id=980 bgcolor=#fefefe
| 5980 ||  || — || March 26, 1993 || Kushiro || S. Ueda, H. Kaneda || FLO || align=right | 4.2 km || 
|-id=981 bgcolor=#E9E9E9
| 5981 Kresilas || 2140 P-L ||  || September 24, 1960 || Palomar || PLS || — || align=right | 9.5 km || 
|-id=982 bgcolor=#E9E9E9
| 5982 Polykletus || 4862 T-1 ||  || May 13, 1971 || Palomar || PLS || — || align=right | 7.4 km || 
|-id=983 bgcolor=#E9E9E9
| 5983 Praxiteles || 2285 T-2 ||  || September 29, 1973 || Palomar || PLS || — || align=right | 5.7 km || 
|-id=984 bgcolor=#fefefe
| 5984 Lysippus || 4045 T-3 ||  || October 16, 1977 || Palomar || PLS || — || align=right | 5.7 km || 
|-id=985 bgcolor=#fefefe
| 5985 || 1942 RJ || — || September 7, 1942 || Turku || L. Oterma || — || align=right | 6.2 km || 
|-id=986 bgcolor=#fefefe
| 5986 Xenophon || 1969 TA ||  || October 2, 1969 || Zimmerwald || P. Wild || — || align=right | 8.2 km || 
|-id=987 bgcolor=#fefefe
| 5987 Liviogratton || 1975 LQ ||  || June 6, 1975 || El Leoncito || Félix Aguilar Obs. || — || align=right | 4.7 km || 
|-id=988 bgcolor=#E9E9E9
| 5988 Gorodnitskij ||  ||  || April 1, 1976 || Nauchnij || N. S. Chernykh || EUN || align=right | 6.3 km || 
|-id=989 bgcolor=#fefefe
| 5989 Sorin ||  ||  || August 26, 1976 || Nauchnij || N. S. Chernykh || — || align=right | 3.5 km || 
|-id=990 bgcolor=#fefefe
| 5990 Panticapaeon || 1977 EO ||  || March 9, 1977 || Nauchnij || N. S. Chernykh || — || align=right | 4.9 km || 
|-id=991 bgcolor=#fefefe
| 5991 Ivavladis ||  ||  || April 25, 1979 || Nauchnij || N. S. Chernykh || NYS || align=right | 4.2 km || 
|-id=992 bgcolor=#E9E9E9
| 5992 Nittler || 1981 DZ ||  || February 28, 1981 || Siding Spring || S. J. Bus || — || align=right | 7.0 km || 
|-id=993 bgcolor=#fefefe
| 5993 Tammydickinson ||  ||  || March 2, 1981 || Siding Spring || S. J. Bus || — || align=right | 4.8 km || 
|-id=994 bgcolor=#d6d6d6
| 5994 Yakubovich ||  ||  || September 29, 1981 || Nauchnij || L. V. Zhuravleva || — || align=right | 12 km || 
|-id=995 bgcolor=#E9E9E9
| 5995 Saint-Aignan || 1982 DK ||  || February 20, 1982 || Anderson Mesa || E. Bowell || — || align=right | 7.8 km || 
|-id=996 bgcolor=#E9E9E9
| 5996 Julioangel || 1983 NR ||  || July 11, 1983 || Anderson Mesa || E. Bowell || — || align=right | 8.6 km || 
|-id=997 bgcolor=#fefefe
| 5997 Dirac || 1983 TH ||  || October 1, 1983 || Kleť || A. Mrkos || — || align=right | 4.9 km || 
|-id=998 bgcolor=#E9E9E9
| 5998 Sitenský ||  ||  || September 2, 1986 || Kleť || A. Mrkos || NEM || align=right | 15 km || 
|-id=999 bgcolor=#FA8072
| 5999 Plescia || 1987 HA ||  || April 23, 1987 || Palomar || C. S. Shoemaker, E. M. Shoemaker || — || align=right | 7.1 km || 
|-id=000 bgcolor=#E9E9E9
| 6000 United Nations || 1987 UN ||  || October 27, 1987 || Brorfelde || P. Jensen || EUN || align=right | 11 km || 
|}

References

External links 
 Discovery Circumstances: Numbered Minor Planets (5001)–(10000) (IAU Minor Planet Center)

0005